= Eamonn Keane (weightlifter) =

Irish teacher and athlete

Eamonn Keane is an Irish primary school teacher from Louisburgh, County Mayo who specialises in endurance weightlifting.

== Media coverage ==
His bench press record is mentioned in the 2005 edition of Guinness World Records. and later mentioned in the 2008 book World's Stupidest Athletes by Barb Karg and Rick Sutherland and in the 2013 book Weight Lifting and Weight Training by Noah Daniels.

Eamonn was the subject of a Cogar documentary called Éamonn Ó Cathain – An Fear Iarainn on Ireland's Irish Language Station TG4 released 6 November 2011. In the documentary, Eamonn goes in search of his ultimate goal in weightlifting by attempting to become the only man ever to achieve a career "grand slam" of world records in 12 different endurance weightlifting disciplines.

His 13th record was ratified in December 2011.

One of his records was included in Guinness World Records 2012, mentioning his arm-curled weight in an hour.

Four of his records were included in Guinness World Records 2013, pertaining to the most weighted lifted in an hour in the bench press, barbell row, dumbbell row and lateral raise.

He is also included in the 2015 edition.

== Guinness World Records ==
Records set	Sum of weight lifted	Date	#	Notes
Bench press most weight in hour	138,480 kg (305,300 lb)	22 July 2003	1	1,280 reps with 200 lb and 493 reps with 100 lb
Arm curl most weight in hour	51,314.8 pounds	2007	2?	Beaten 12 May 2011 by Robert Natoli who curled a 47-pound barbell 1,277 times. Eamonn would get this record back in May 2012.
Dumbbell row most weight in hour	32,730 kg (72,157 lb)	30 March 2010	3?	1,119 repetitions of a 15 kg dumbbell with his left arm and 1,063 repetitions with his right
Rear lateral raise most weight in hour	32,500 kg (71,650 lb)	6 October 2010	4?	
Lateral raise most weight in hour	19,600 kg (43,210 lb)	1 February 2011	5?	
Incline fly most weight in hour	40,600 kg (89,508 lb)	28 September 2011	6? or 13	2030 reps of 10 kg dumbbells
Front raise most weight in hour	18,830 kg (41513 lb)	12 October 2011	7 or 14	
Arm curl most weight in hour	50,320 kg (110,936 lb 9 oz)	31 May 2012	8 or 15	
Upright row most weight in hour	34,300 kg (75 618.56 lb)	24 July 2012	9 or 16	
Arm curl most weight in minute	3,600 kg (7,937 lb)	18 November 2012	10-14 or 17-21	30 reps of a 120 kg weight
Barbell row most weight in hour	36,348 kg (80,133 lb 9.92 oz)	18 November 2012	10-14 or 17-21	1,056 lifts of a 120 kg weight
Bench press most weight in minute	6,960 kg (15,344 lb)	18 November 2012	10-14 or 17-21	
Deadlift most weight in minute	5,520 kg (12,170 lb)	18 November 2012	10-14 or 17-21	
Squat most weight in minute	4,200 kg (9,259 lb)	18 November 2012	10-14 or 17-21	35 reps of a 120 kg weight See #Challenger for record contentment.
barbell row most weight in minute	4,700 kg (10,361.73 lb)	8 December 2012	15-17 or 22-24	47 lifts of a 100 kg barbell See #Challenger for record contentment.
standing barbell press most weight in minute	4,000 kg (8,818 lb)	8 December 2012	15-17 or 22-24	
standing barbell press most weight in hour	68,500 kg (151,016.6 lb)	8 December 2012	15-17 or 22-24	40 reps of a 100 kg weight
Deadlift most weight in hour	115,360 kg (254,325 lb 4.58 oz)	14 July 2013	18 or 25	
Front raise most weight in minute	1,215 kg (2,678.62 lb)	16 October 2013	19-22 or 26-29	54 lifts in total, 27 with each arm, of 22.5 kg dumbbells. See #Challenger for record contestment.
Incline fly most weight in minute	2,160 kg (4,761 lb 15.84 oz)	16 October 2013	19-22 or 26-29	48 lifts using two 22.5 kg dumbbells See #Challenger for record contestment.
Lateral raise most weight in minute	1,575 kg (3,472 lb 4.48 oz)	16 October 2013	19-22 or 26-29	35 lifts with two 22.5 kg dumbbells
Rear lateral raise most weight in minute	1,845 kg (4,067.53 lb)	16 October 2013	19-22 or 26-29	41 lifts with two 22.5 kg dumbbells

He has also previously held world weightlifting records in at least 4 other categories.
