= Rear delt raise =

Weight training exercise

The rear delt raise, also known as the rear deltoid raise, or rear shoulder raise is an exercise in weight training. This exercise is an isolation exercise that heavily works the posterior deltoid muscle. The movement is primarily limited to the two shoulder joints: the glenohumeral joint and the scapulothoracic joint. Scapular movement will also cause movement in the sternoclavicular joint and acromioclavicular joint. If the elbow bends during the extension exercises, it gravitates into a rowing motion.

== Transverse forms ==
Movements for the posterior deltoid done in the transverse plane are also referred to by terms like rear delt fly, reverse fly, rear lateral raise, bent-over lateral raises or other variations. Other muscles that aid the posterior deltoid include the two lateral rotators of the rotator cuff: the infraspinatus and teres minor. Other muscles such as the lats and middle delts can also come into action, dependent on how the shoulder is rotated.

To execute the exercise, the weightlifter attains a prone rib cage position. This is usually done by standing and bending over, or by laying face-down on a bench. Flat is ideal, though slight inclines can also be used. The arms hang straight down. The goal is to bring the arms to the side away from the body at a 90-degree angle. While leverage is most difficult with fully extended elbows, a slight bend is useful as it allows the lifter to maintain awareness of this.

This movement is commonly done using dumbbells to add resistance to the weight of the arms. It is mostly a joint isolation movement of the shoulder.

During the transverse lifts, the scapulae will also articulate and adduct/retract as the weights lift, then abduct/protract as the weights are lowered. Some lifters will retract the scapulae and hold them there, as opposed to letting them protract, to get a better stretch in the posterior deltoid. Muscles that retract the scapulae include the rhomboid muscle and the trapezius muscle.

=== Transverse abduction ===
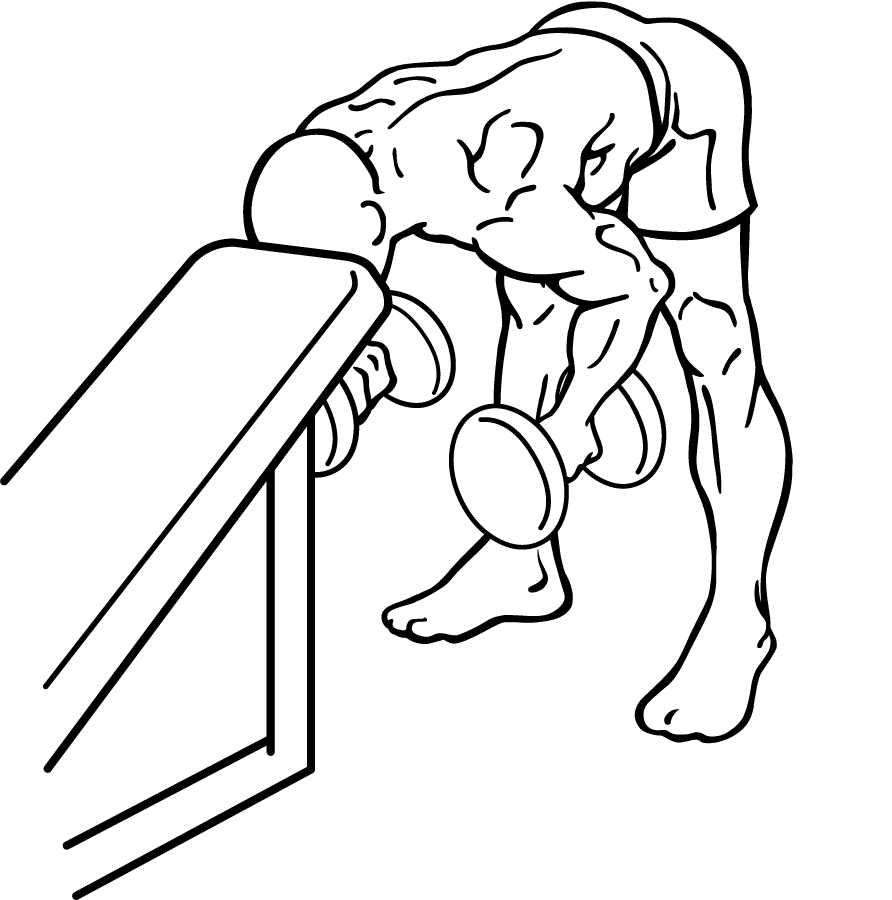
Bilateral standing dumbbell fly begin

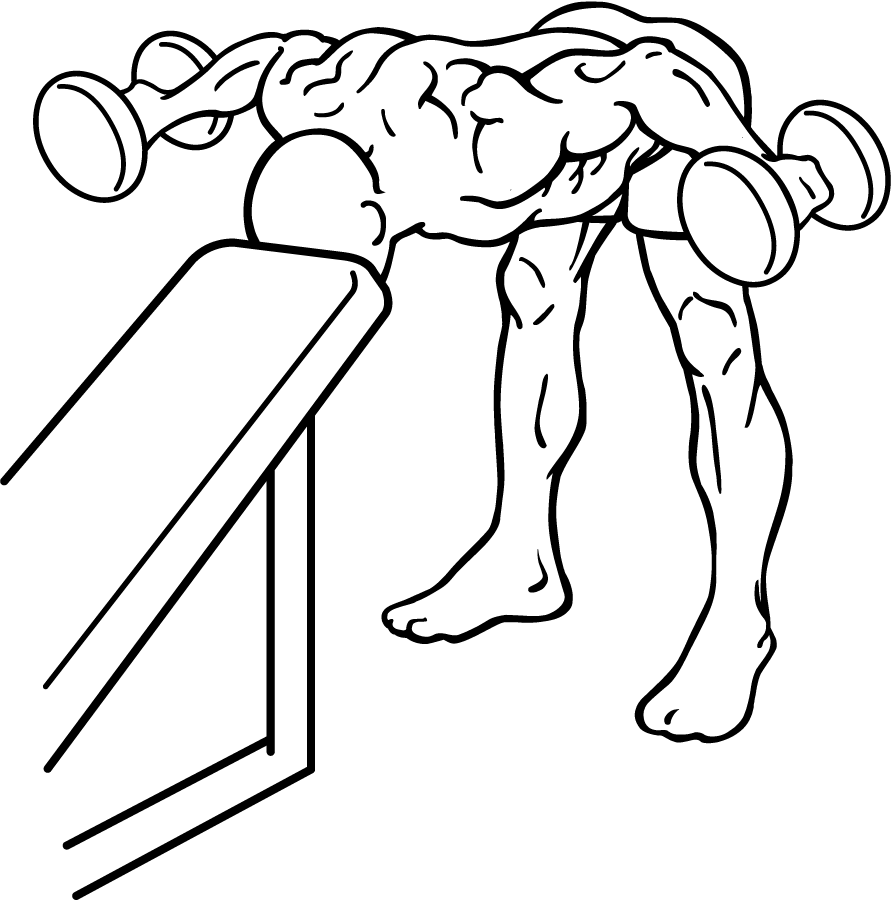
Bilateral standing dumbbell fly end

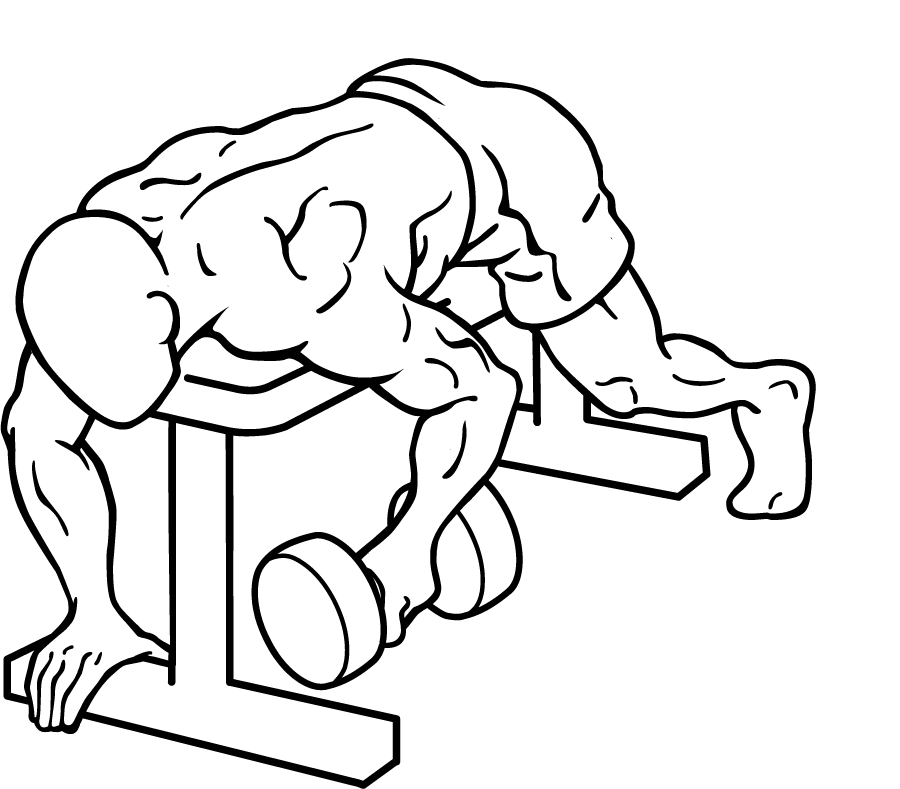
Unilateral lying dumbbell fly begin

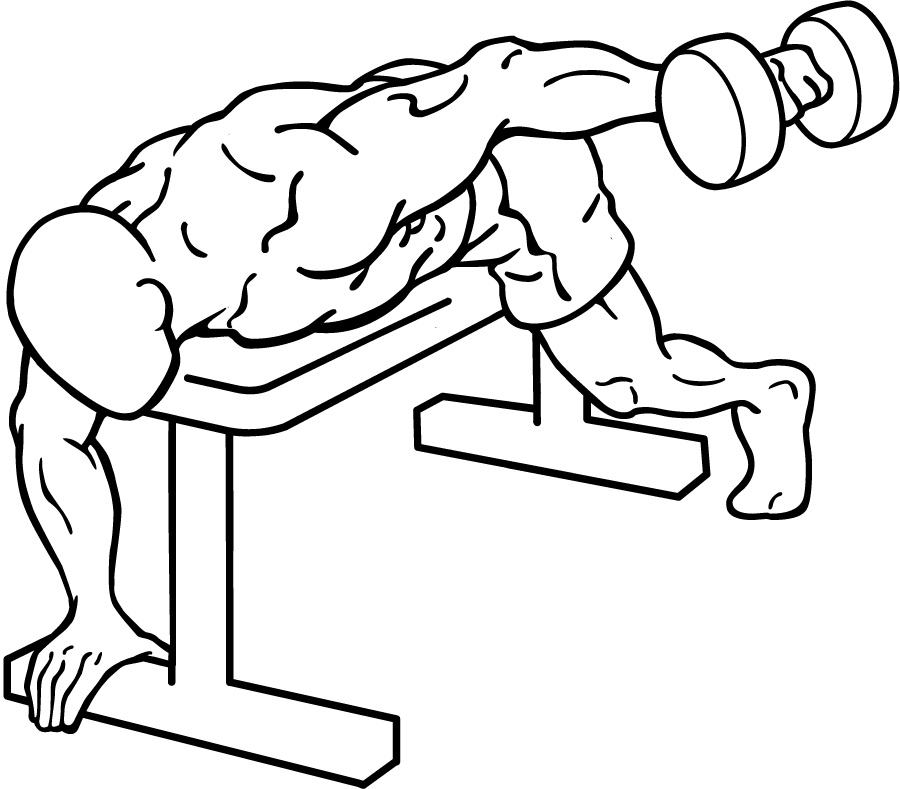
Unilateral lying dumbbell fly end

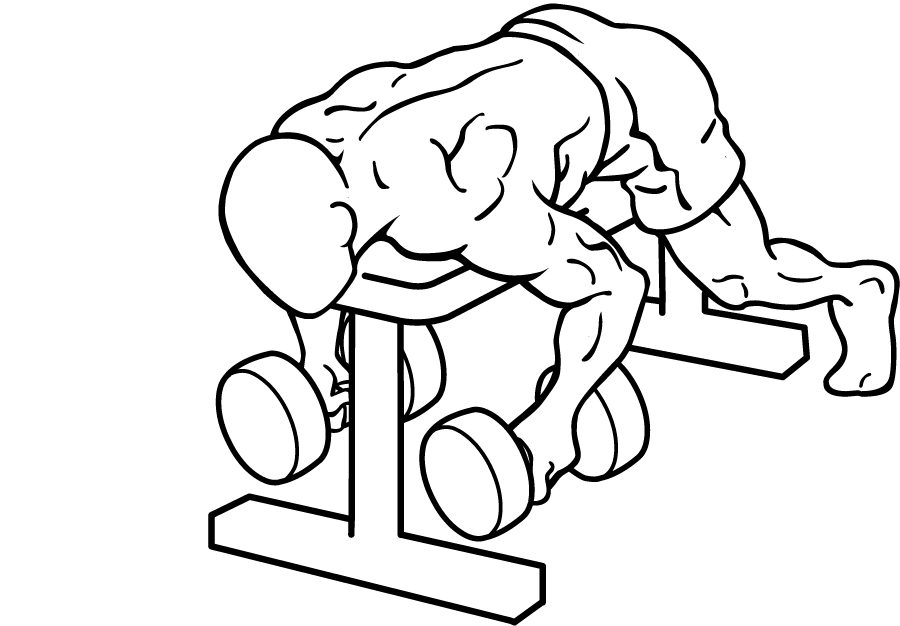
Bilateral lying dumbbell fly start

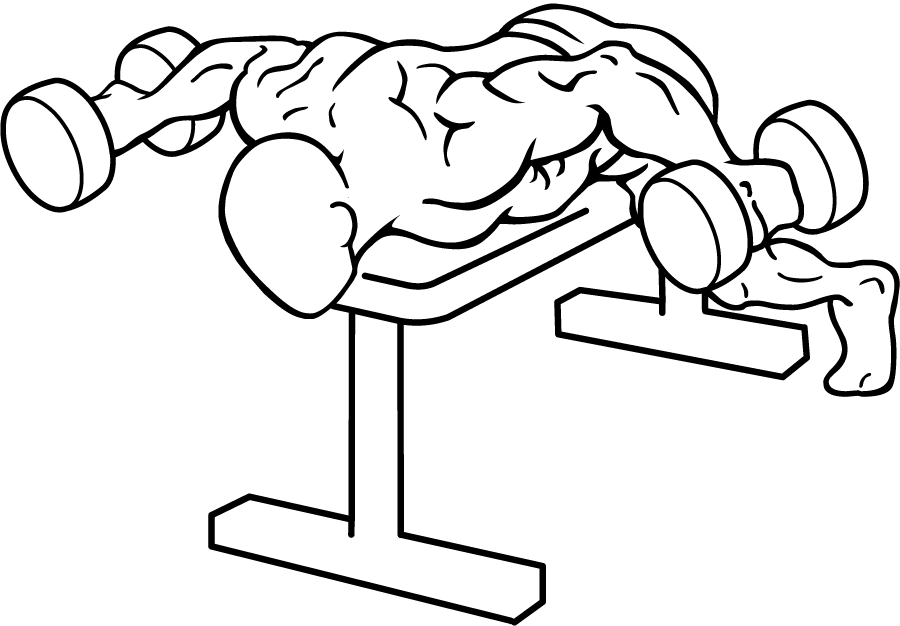
Bilateral lying dumbbell fly end

The forearm should have a neutral grip, the back of the hand should be facing outward (laterally), turning to face away from the ground as the arm raises. The palms should be facing inward, moving to face towards the ground as the arms raise. Due to the external (lateral) rotation, the work is shifted forward and the lateral head of the deltoid assist the lateral rotators in transverse abduction. The arms have the same orientation relative to the ground as in the "shoulder fly" which is done to target the lateral deltoid. The difference is that the angle of the torso changes, and the change in the shoulder's rotation and angle of movement relative to the body means the lateral head is a synergist rather than the prime mover.

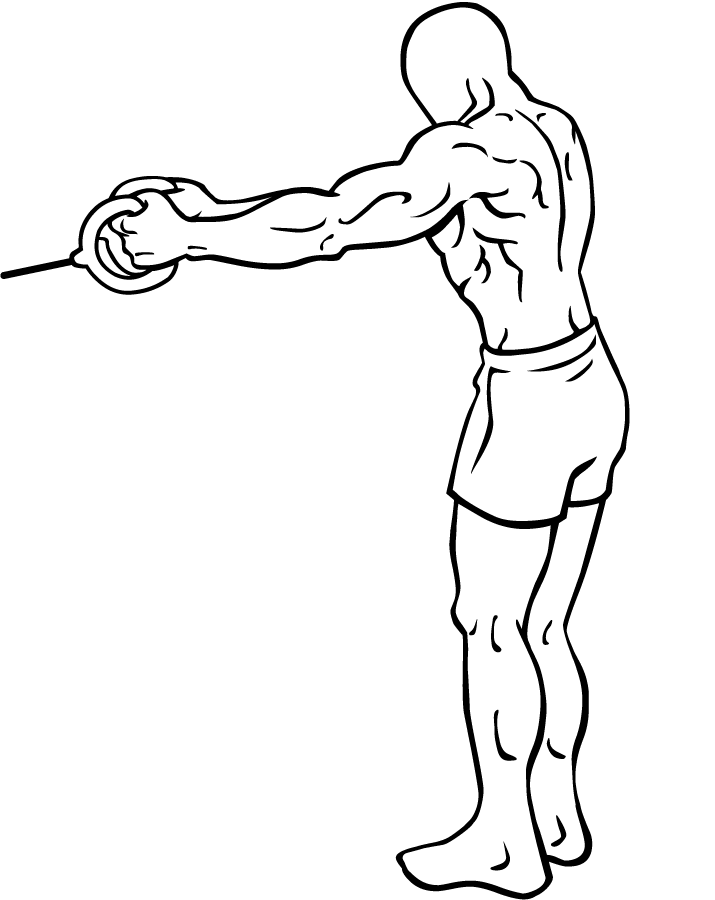
Bilateral band fly begin

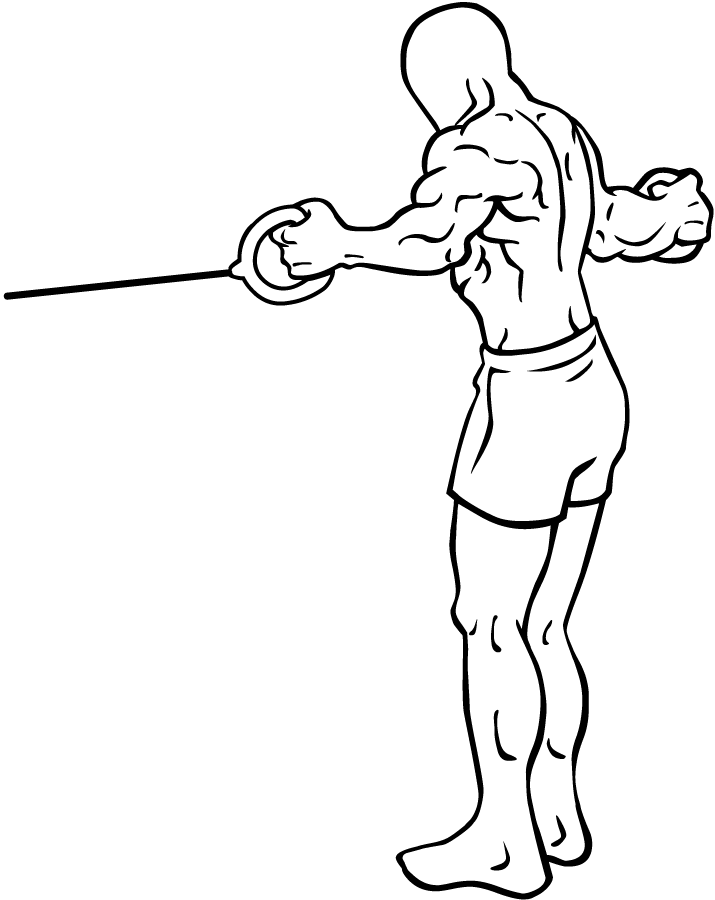
Bilateral band fly end

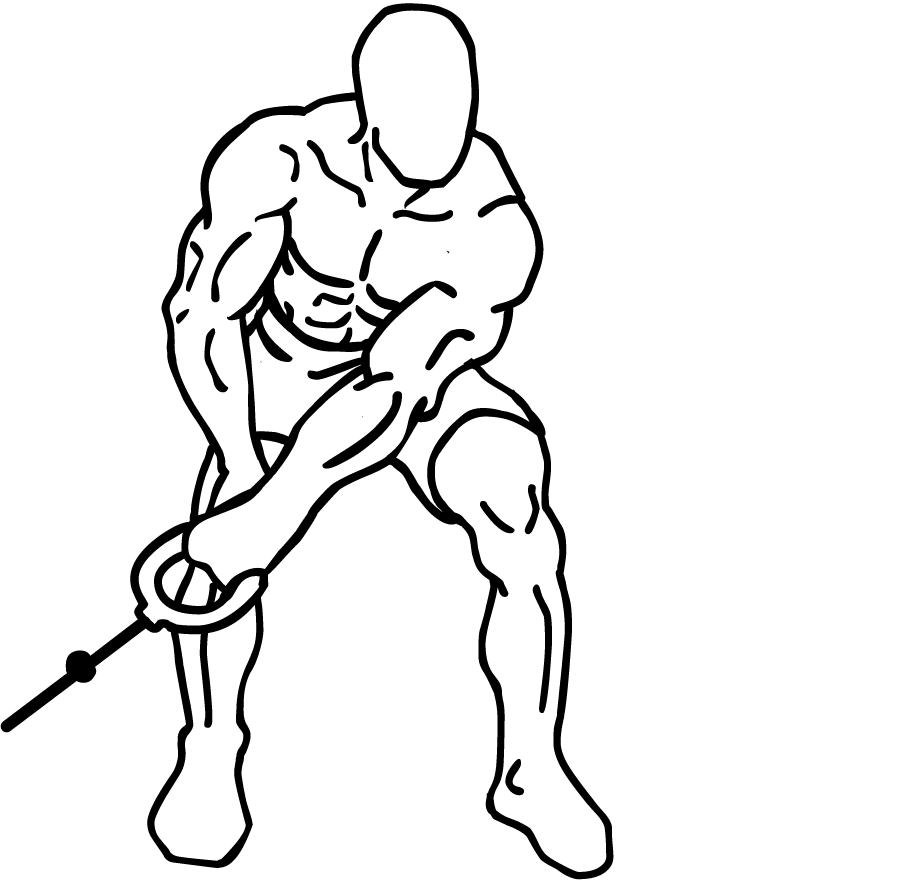
Unilateral cable raise begin

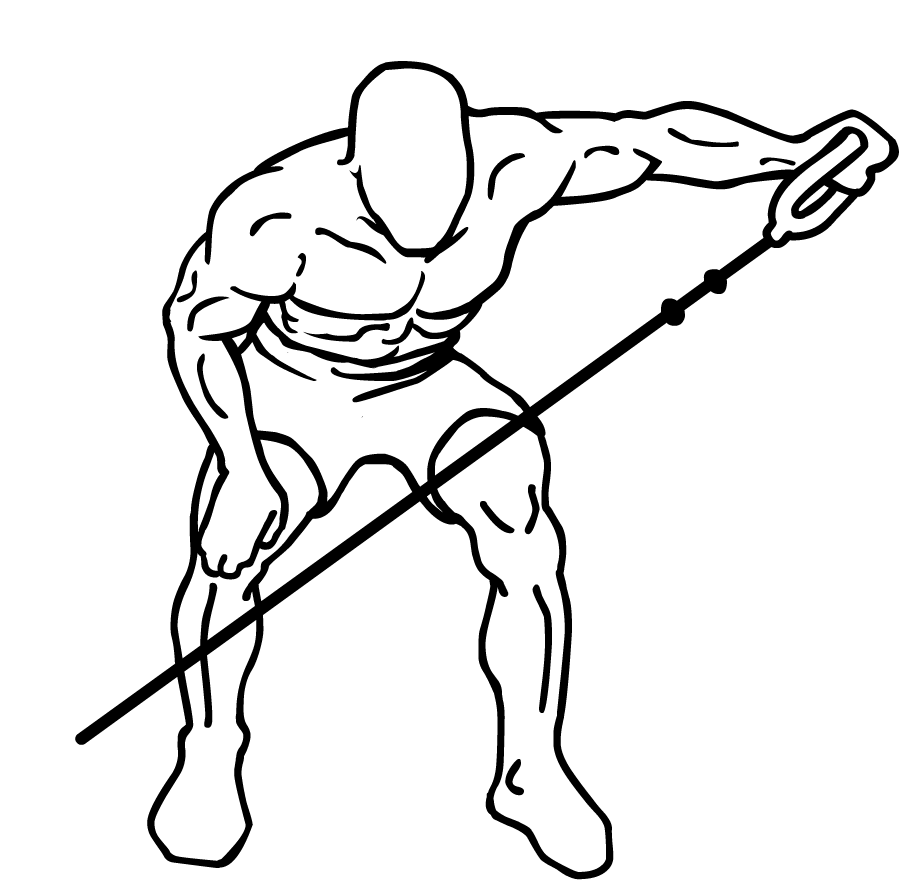
Unilateral cable raise end

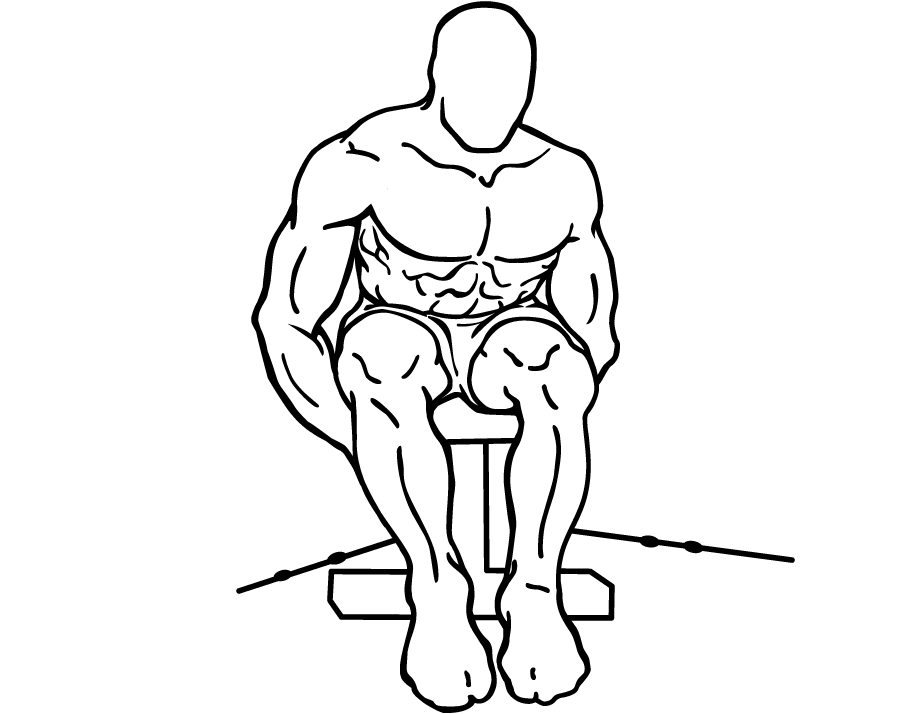
Bilateral cable fly begin

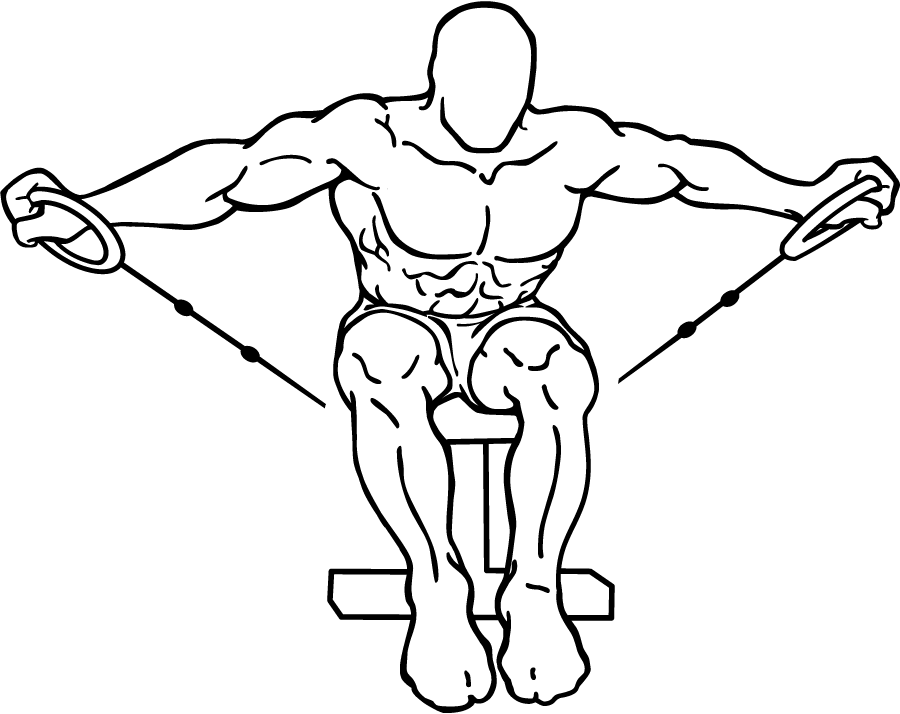
Bilateral cable fly end

Due to the lateral rotation, the elbows point inferior towards the lifter's hips throughout the movement, as opposed to pointing outward/upward as they do in transverse extension. Ligaments that stabilize and prevent deformation of the elbow joint are involved due to the angle of lateral force on the outside of the joint, much as medial forces on the inside of the joint are involved in transverse adduction (chest fly variations).

If the lifter does not lock the elbow, the lateral rotators (posterior deltoid, infraspinatus, teres minor) are also involved in preventing internal (medial) rotation. The more the elbow is bent, the more leverage gravity has pull the hand down and turn into a transverse extension angle. A bent elbow can allow greater weight to be lifted, and may shift the work of transverse abduction more heavily onto the lateral head of the deltoid as the prime movers work to prevent internal rotation.

=== Transverse extension ===
The forearm should have a neutral grip, the back of the hand should be superior and the palm should be inferior. The elbows should be pointed towards the scapulae. The Latissimus dorsi muscles aids the lateral rotators in transverse extension. The anconeus muscles and triceps brachii muscles are involved isometrically in keeping the elbow straightened.

To keep the focus on the rear deltoid when lifting, it is imperative to keep the elbows away from the body and avoid torso movement, This ensures ideal isolation. The posterior fibers are usually undertrained for many and do not require heavy weights at first.

A compound variation is the bent over row done with a wide overhand grip that allows the elbows out, as opposed to the elbows-in lat-targeting variation. This is also referred to as a "rear delt row" as opposed to a "raise". Bodyweight/supine rows (or "australian pullups") can also be done with a wide overhand grip to target the rear delts. It requires less work by the lower back and legs to stabilize.

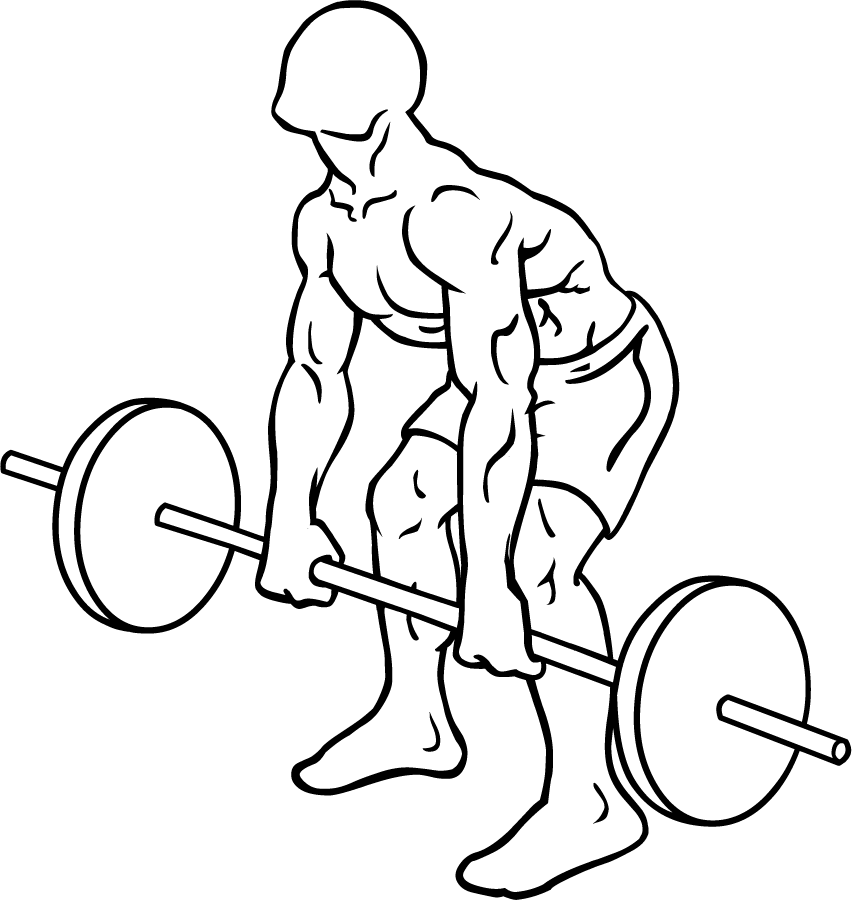
Barbell rear delt row begin

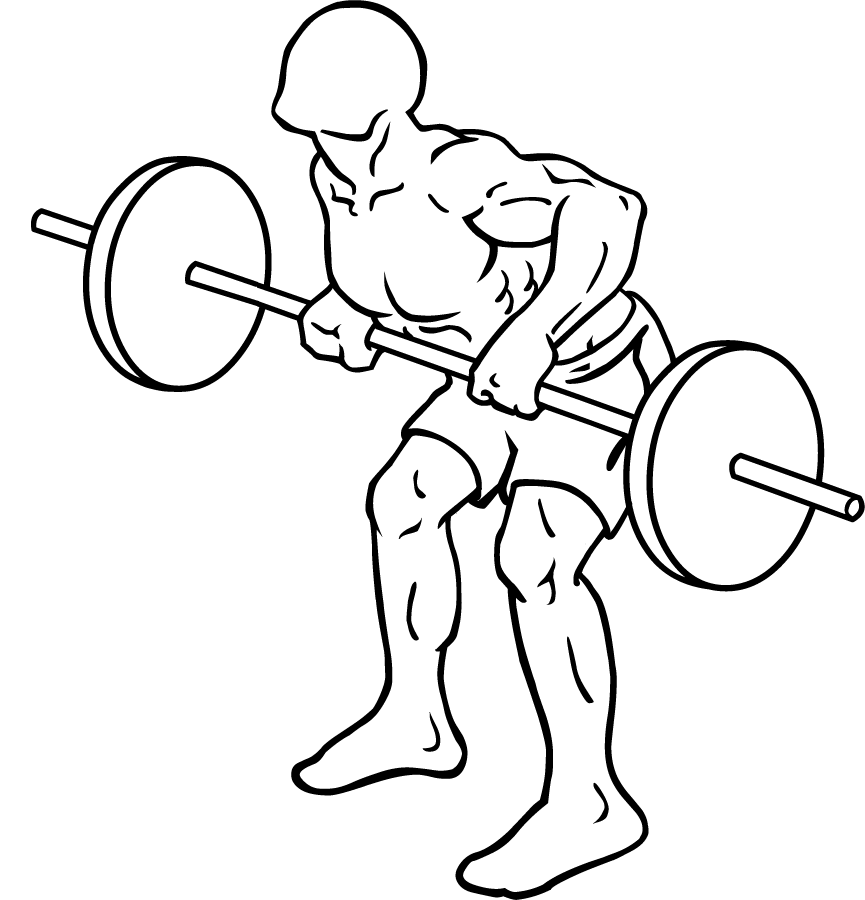
Barbell rear delt row end

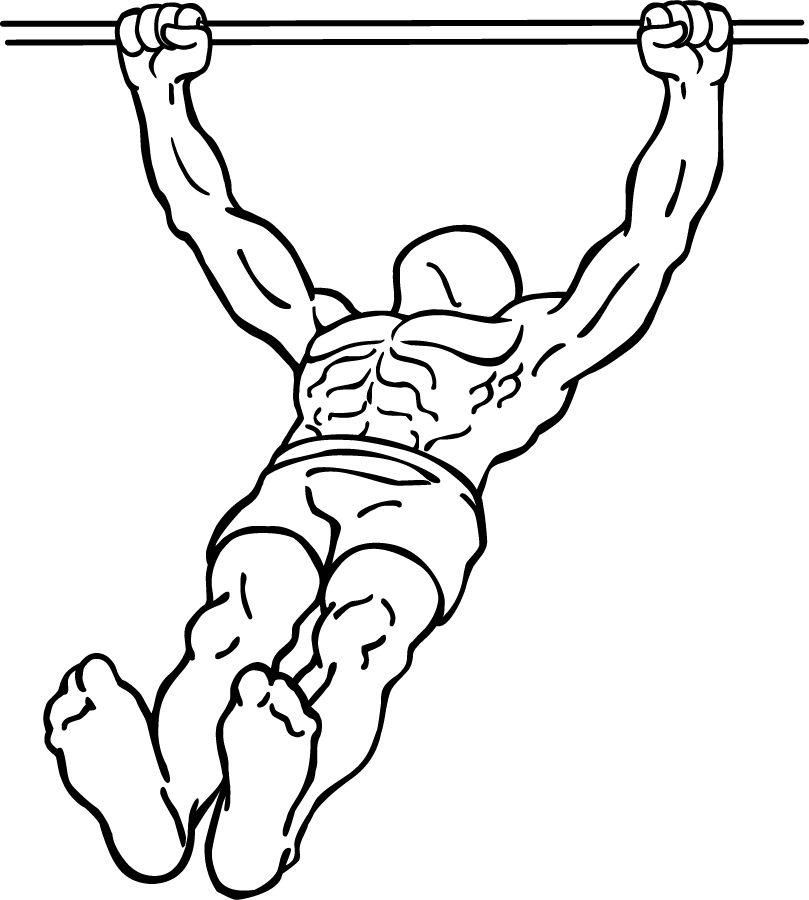
Supine rear delt row begin

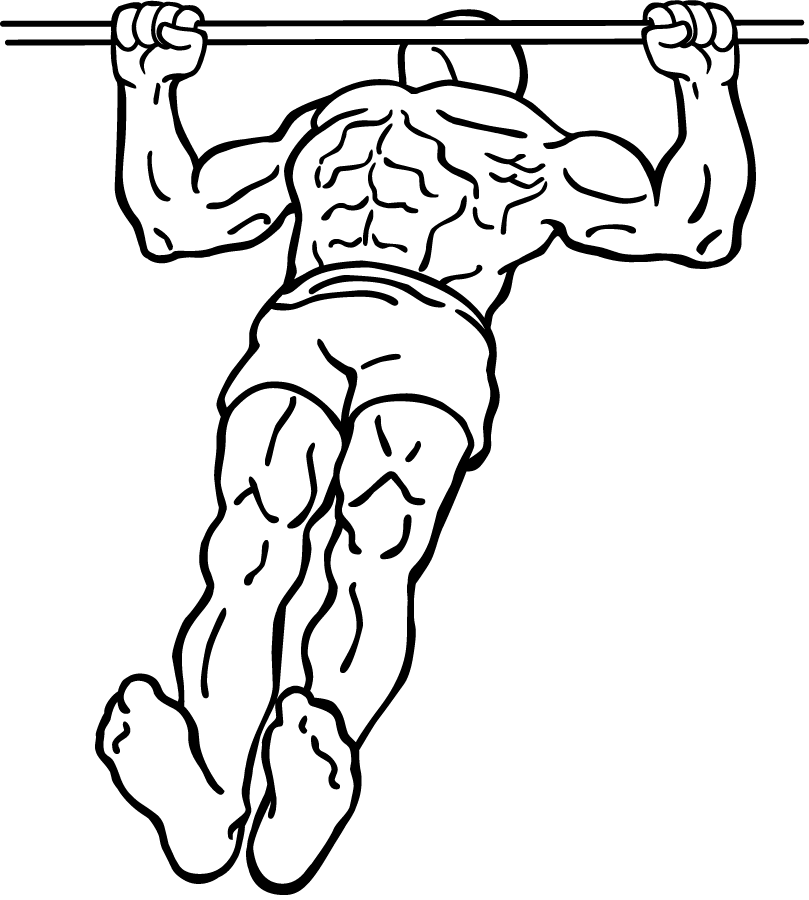
Supine rear delt row end

The above variation is most difficult when the muscle is maximally contracted, and allows both arms to be worked out at once. To emphasize the contraction in a stretched position using a weight, the arms must be worked unilaterally. The exerciser rotates the side he is working toward the ceiling and lies on the opposite side. The resistance meets its peak when the humerus is parallel with the ground. To attain a similar effect, it is common to use a cable crossover variation to the rear lateral raise, which allows the angle to be done on both sides simultaneously and without lying on one's side, which can be uncomfortable for some people.

== Hyper extension form ==
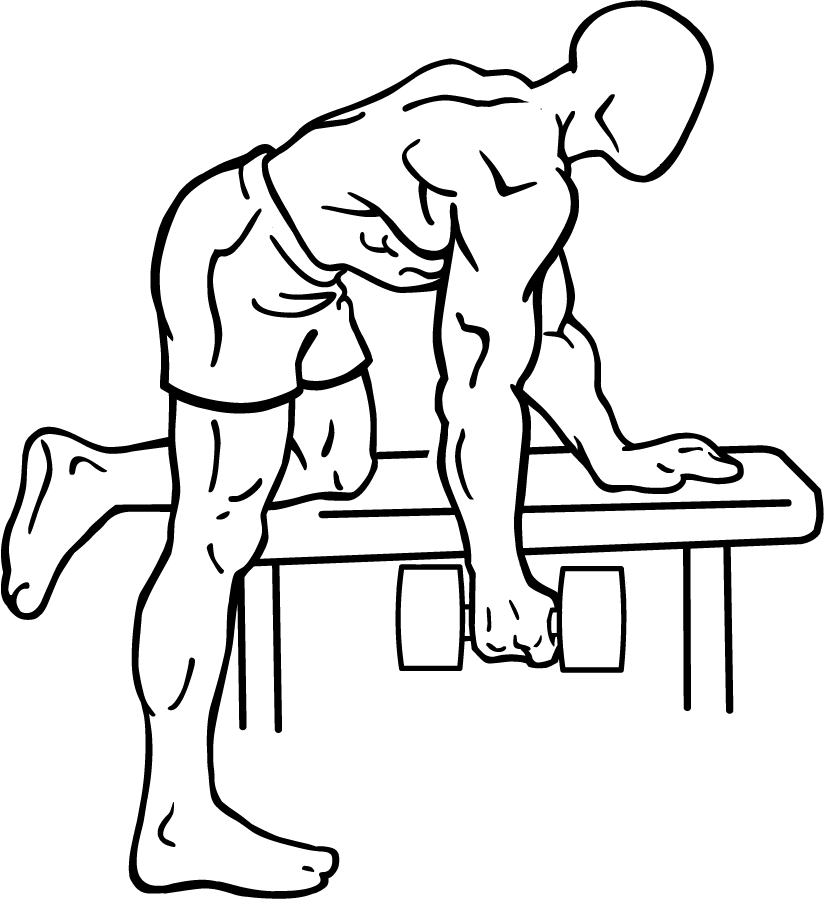
Dumbbell hyperextension row start

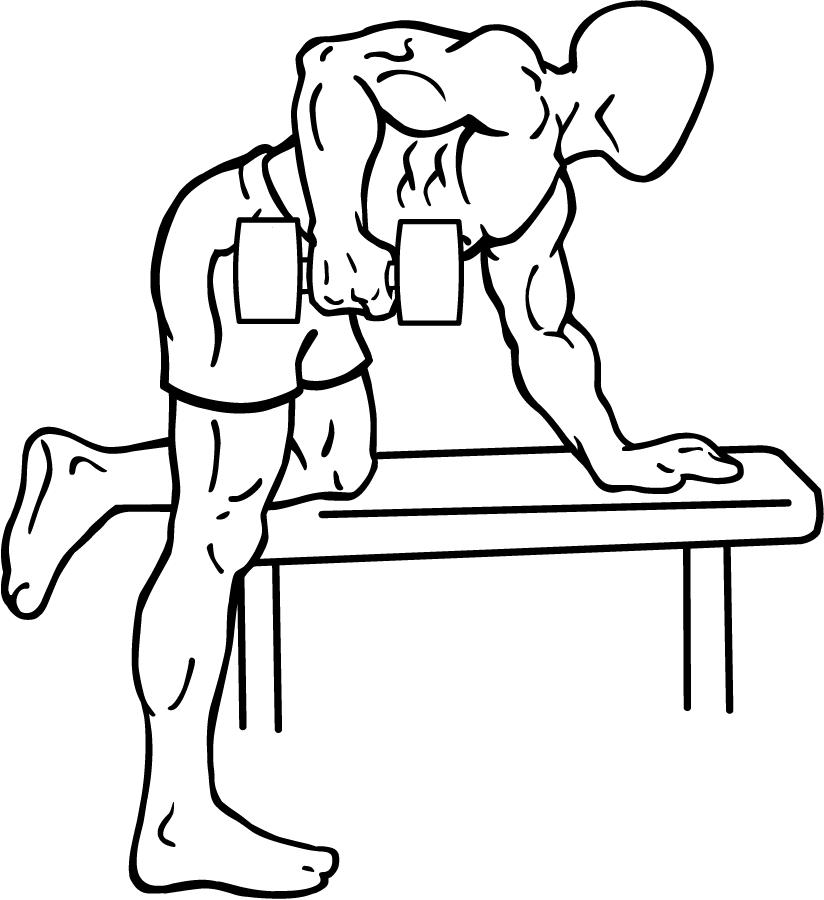
Dumbbell hyperextension row end

Another option for doing a raise to target the posterior deltoid is hyperextending the glenohumeral joint. The lat is no longer an extensor at this point, so it is primarily the posterior deltoid and long head of the triceps that perform hyperextension. The range of motion for this is very limited, most people can't even hyperextend 45 degrees. This is also a static-active stretch for the anterior deltoid and biceps.

A compound variation is a behind the back row. This row, when performed with a barbell, has also been called a rear delt raise.
