= Eamonn Keane =

Eamonn Keane may refer to:

- Eamonn Keane (weightlifter), Irish school teacher and endurance weightlifter
- Eamonn Keane (actor) (1925–1990), Irish actor
