= Machine fly =

Strength training exercise

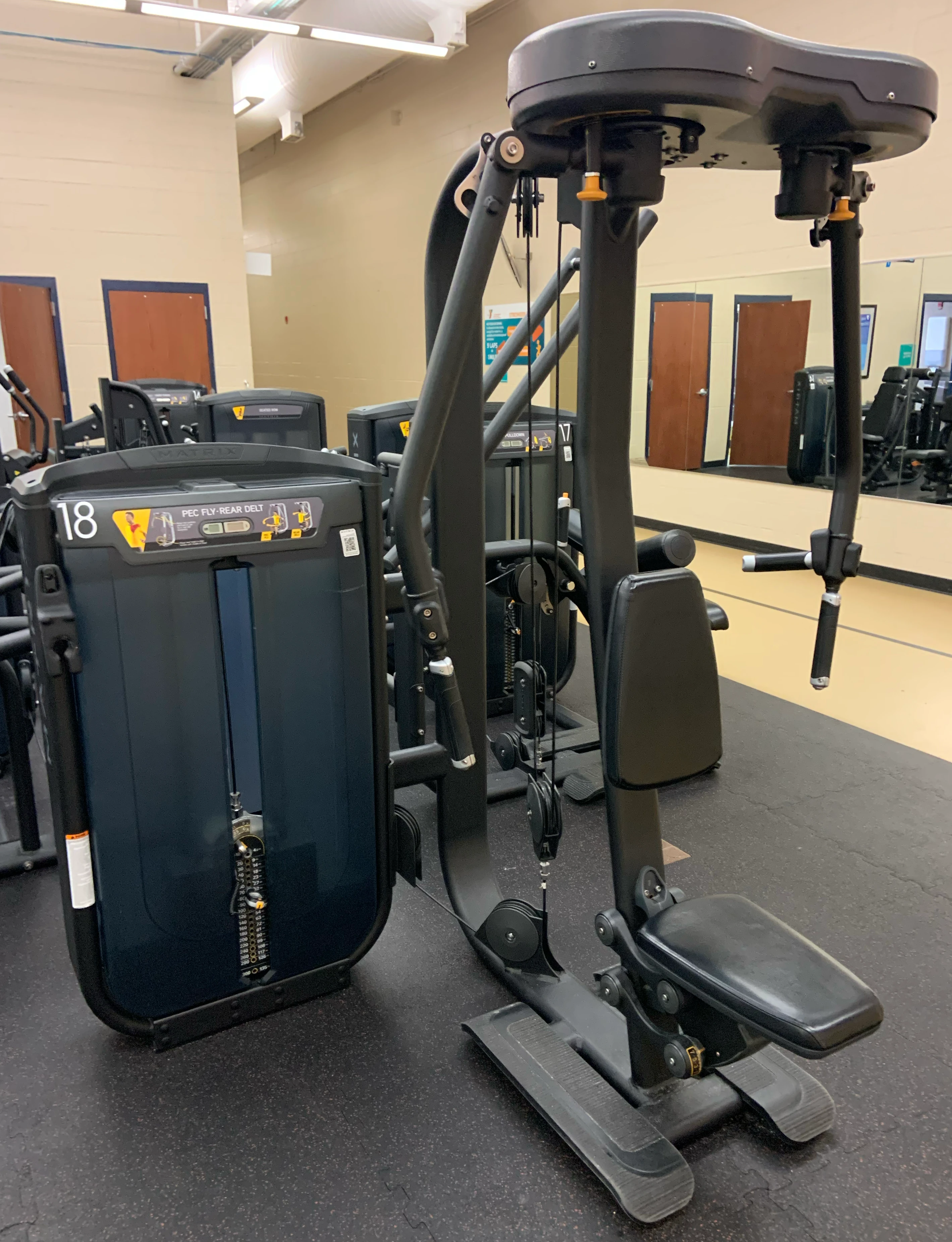
Fly machine

A machine fly, alternatively called a seated lever fly or "pec deck" fly is a strength training exercise based on the free weight chest fly. As with the chest fly, the hand and arm move through an arc while the elbow is kept at a constant angle. Flyes are used to work the muscles of the upper body, primarily the sternal head of the pectoralis major. Because these exercises use the arms as levers at their longest possible length, the amount of weight that can be moved is significantly less than equivalent press exercises for the same muscles (the military press and bench press for the shoulder and chest respectively). Denie Walter is credited with calling it the Peck Dec back in the 1970s.

== Equipment ==
There are two designs of weight training machines available for this exercise. The seated lever fly machine, and the Pec Dec. The seated lever fly involves grasping two handles at shoulder height, and pushing them together while keeping the elbows at a constant angle. When using the Pec Dec machine the hands grip two handles at head height, while the forearms push against two pads at chest height. The anterior deltoids are used as synergists in both variations. The biceps brachii act as a synergist in the seated lever exercise, but not on the Pec Dec due to the raised arm position.

In some machines, the seated lever can be adjusted to perform a rear delt fly exercise.

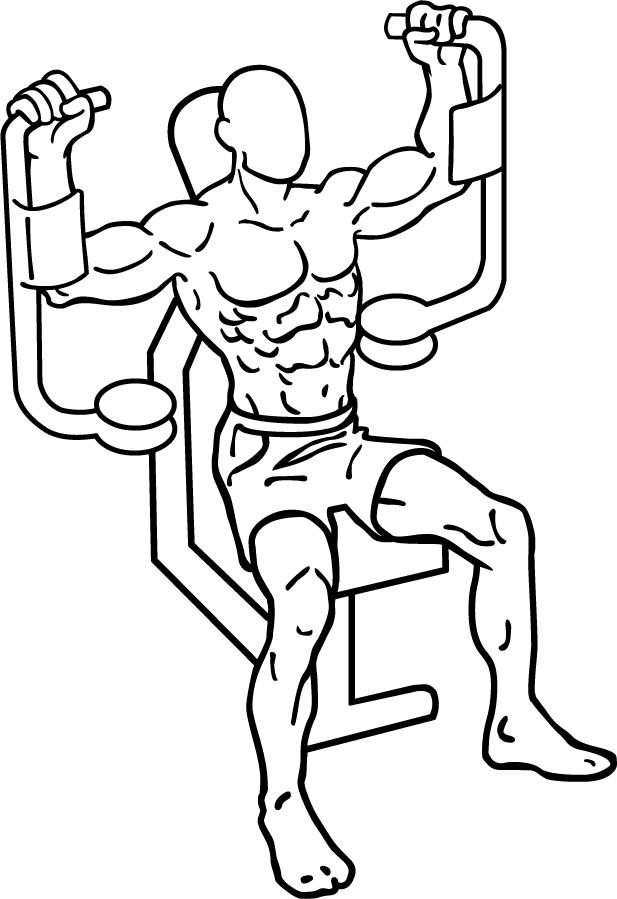
Butterfly machine fly (pec deck) start

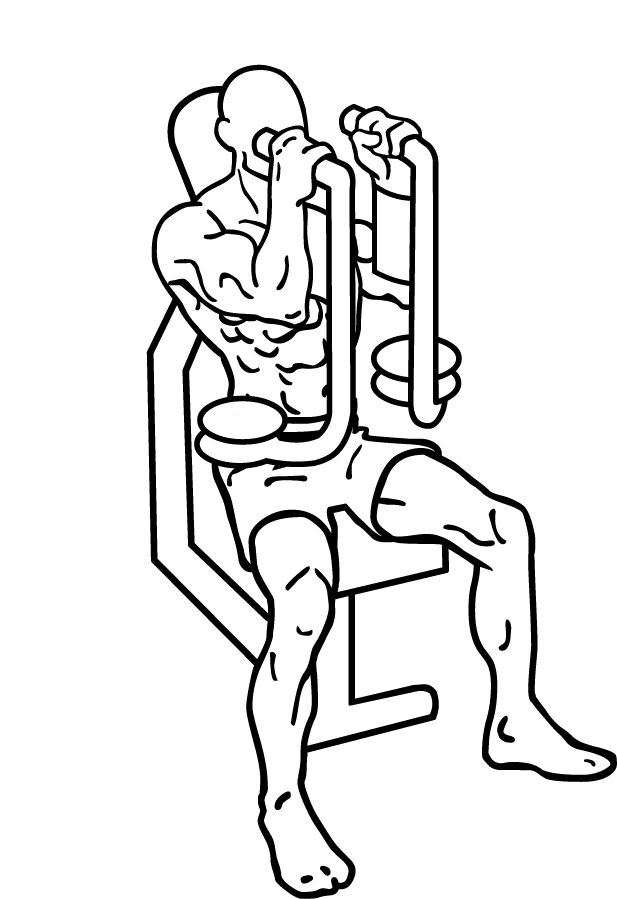
Butterfly machine fly (pec deck) end
