= Cogar =

Irish documentary series

- Genre: documentary
- Country of origin: Ireland
- Original language: Irish
- No. of seasons: 17

Production
- Production locations: Baile na hAbhann, Galway

Original release
- Network: TG4
- Release: 1 October 2000 – present

Cogar (Irish pronunciation: [ˈkɔɡəɾˠ]; "Whisper") is an Irish television documentary series, shown on the Irish language channel TG4. It focuses on people who have been "ignored" or are at the margins of society.

Cogar was first broadcast in 2000, the first episode looking at Dublin's bicycle couriers.

== Episodes ==
=== Notable episodes ===
- 2002: Paddy Fitz, Fear an Hata ("Paddy Fitz, the Man with the Hat"): on the storyteller Paddy Fitzpatrick
- 2006: Ar Thóir Hy Brasil ("In Search of Hy-Brazil"), a documentary on the mythical island
- 2008: an episode on Irish Community Care Manchester
- 2011: Buabhaill ar na Bánta ("Where the Buffalo Roam"), about a water buffalo farmer in County Cork
- 2011: an episode on Cork's Hadji Bey sweetshop
- 2011: Éamonn Ó Cathain – An Fear Iarainn ("Eamonn Keane, the Ironman"), covering a County Mayo weightlifter
- 2014: Bliain an tSneachta Mhóir ("Year of the Big Snow"), on the 1946–47 heavy snowfall
- 2015: Episode on the four Irish American baseball-playing brothers: Steve O'Neill, Jim O'Neill, Jack O'Neill and Mike O'Neill, who played between 1902 and 1928
- 2015: Episode on the controversial 1978 TV adaptation of Langrishe, Go Down
- 2015: Snámh in Aghaidh Easa ("Swimming Against the Current"), about the hazards faced by Aran Islands trawlermen
- 2016: Diarmuid Lynch – Óglach Dearmadta ("Diarmuid Lynch, Forgotten Warrior"), on the life of Diarmuid Lynch
