= Glenn Pendlay =

American weightlifting coach (1970–2019)

Glenn William Pendlay III (24 November 1970 - 5 September 2019) was an American level 5 weight lifting coach, which is the highest accreditation for the olympic weightlifting coaches in the United States.

== Life ==
Glenn was born in McPherson, Kansas on November 24, 1970. He received his bachelor's degree from Kansas State University, master's degree from Montana State University, and was working on his doctorate degree. His studies were in exercise physiology, specializing in endocrinology research. He died of stage 4 metastatic cancer on September 5, 2019. He had two children.

== Career ==
Glenn was involved as a weightlifting coach since 1996. He was introduced to weightlifting by Russian coach Alexander Medvedyev in 1992 at the Junior World Championships for powerlifting in Moscow, Russia. In 1999, he established Wichita Falls Weightlifting. Since then, he coached a score of athletes ranging from youth level, to medalists at the Pan American Championships, Pan American Games, and participants at the IWF World Championship level in both genders. He was involved in Muscledriver USA and California Strength programs.
