= Fly (exercise) =

Strength training exercise

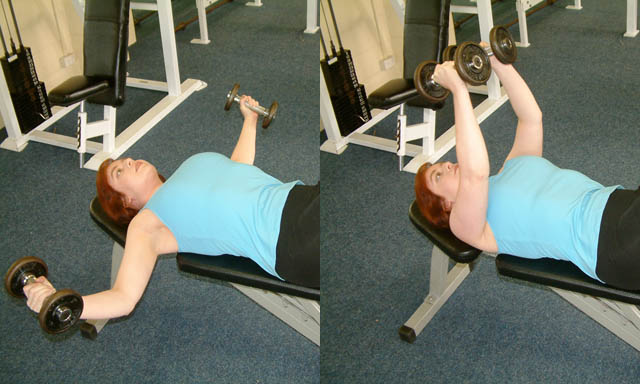
Dumbbell chest fly

A fly or flye is a strength training exercise in which the hand and arm move through an arc while the elbow is kept at a constant angle. Flies are used to work the muscles of the upper body. Because these exercises use the arms as levers at their longest possible length, the amount of weight that can be moved is significantly less than equivalent press exercises for the same muscles (the military press and bench press for the shoulder and chest respectively). Due to this leverage, fly exercises of all types have a large potential to damage the shoulder joint and its associated ligaments and the tendons of the muscles connecting to it. They should be done with caution and their effects first tested while using very light weights; which are gradually incremented after more strength is gained.

== Equipment ==
Flies can be performed using any weight that can be held in the hand. The simplest equipment to use is a dumbbell, though the exercise can also be performed using a cable machine. Flies can be performed supine, sitting or standing upright. When using a cable machine, the hands and arms move through the same anatomical plane as the dumbbell version. Using dumbbells for pectoral flies requires the use of stabilizer muscles associated with performing flies, when compared to performing flies with a cable machine. Flies can also be performed with body weight by doing gymnastic ring chest flies.

=== Chest fly ===
The chest fly or pectoral fly (abbreviated to pec fly) primarily works the pectoralis major muscles to move the arms horizontally forward. If medially (internally) rotated, it is assisted in this by the anterior (front) head of the deltoideus in transverse flexion. If laterally (externally) rotated, the contribution of the deltoid is lessened and the pec major is strongly emphasized as the transverse adductor.

The hands are usually brought out further than the elbows, in which case the flexors contract isometrically to inhibit undesired excess extension of the elbow. Muscles which do this are the biceps brachii, the brachialis and the brachioradialis. The biceps may also play a limited role in shoulder flexion. The straighter the elbow is, the more stretch in these muscles. For safety, many avoid locking out the joint.

The movement is performed lying on the back on a bench, starting weights extended above the chest, meeting at the midsagittal plane. The arms are lowered through an arc passing through the transverse plane, terminating when the arm is roughly parallel to the floor, then returning to the starting position and repeating.

This exercise can be done using other implements than dumbbells, such as kettlebells or weight plates. There are also machines such as the pec deck which perform a stabilized version of the movement while allowing people to sit upright.

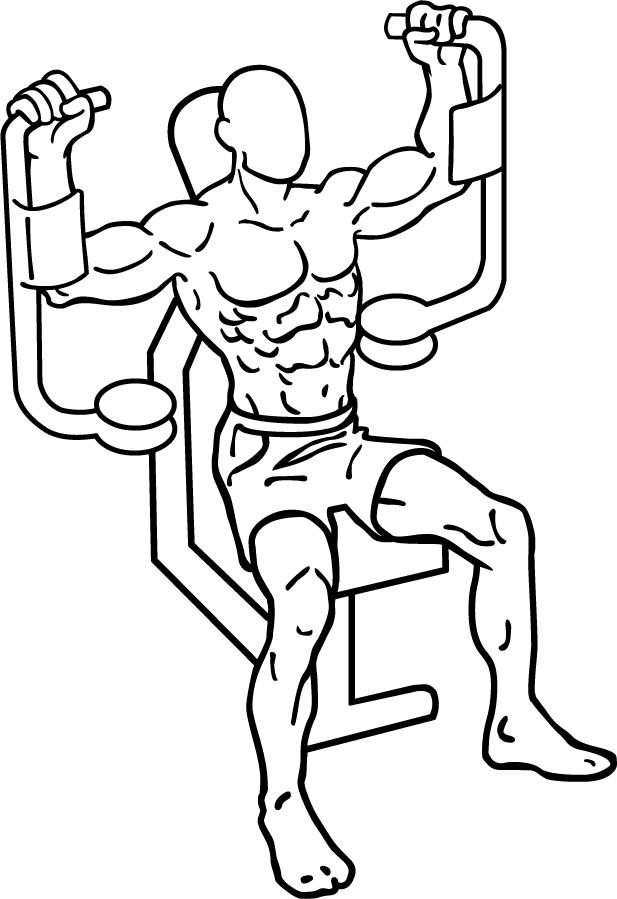
Butterfly machine fly (pec deck) start

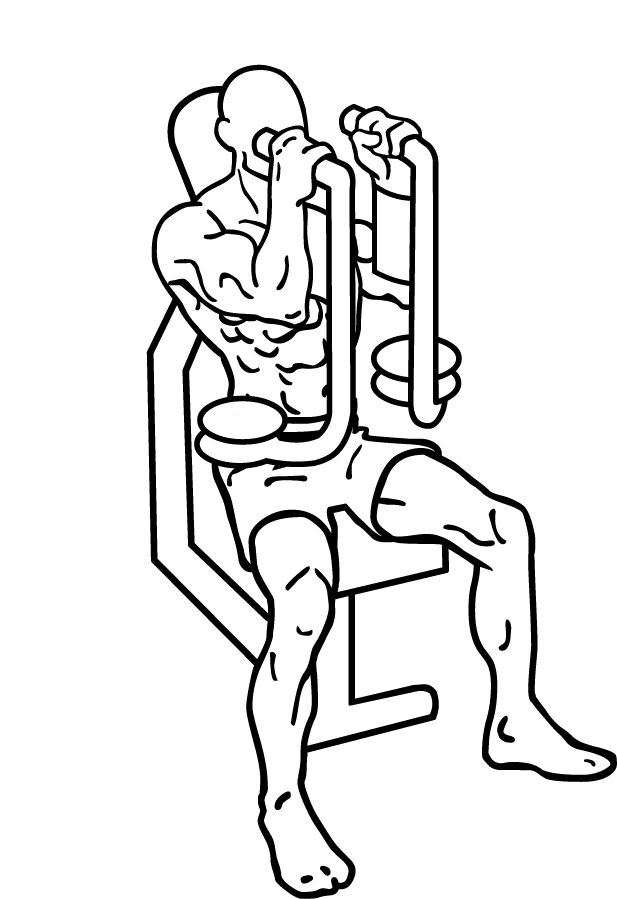
Butterfly machine fly (pec deck) end

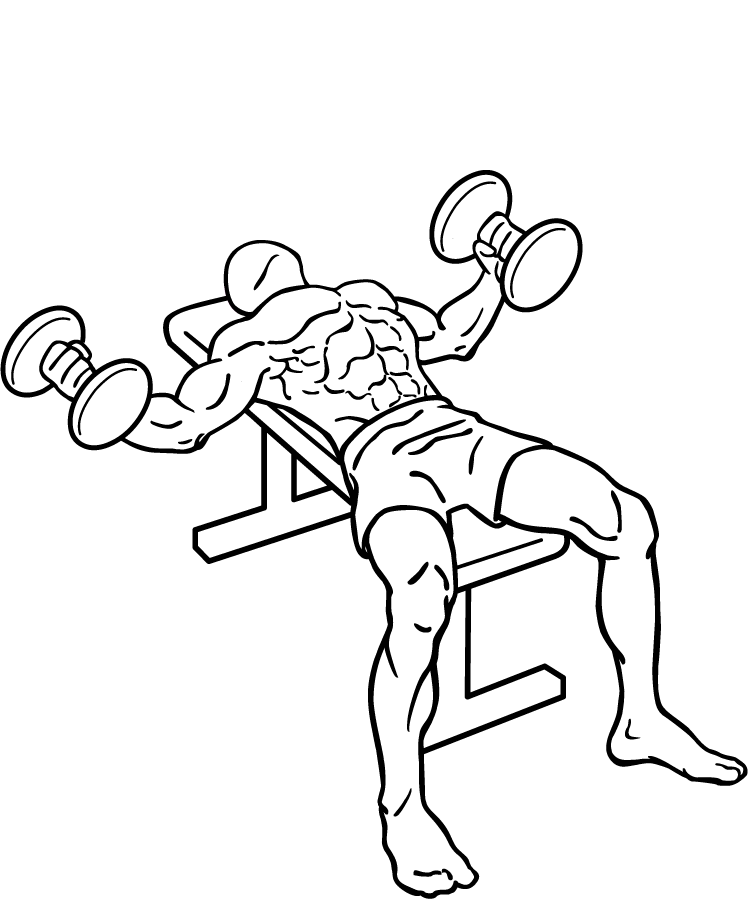
Dumbbell fly start

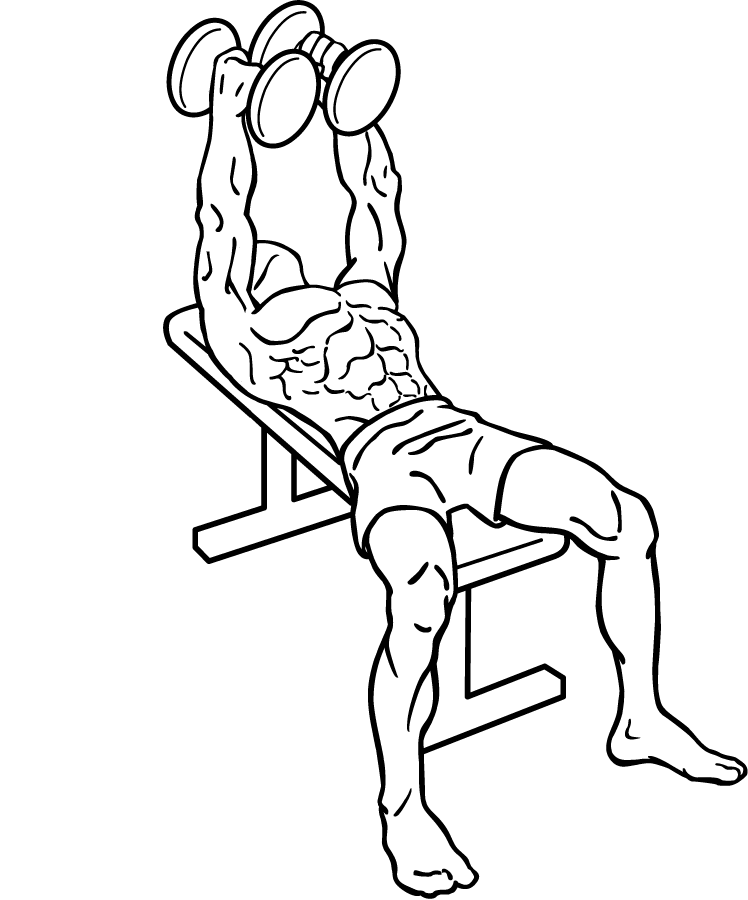
Dumbbell fly end

If using a cable machine, the body leans forward to counterbalance the weight moved, with the feet braced and the elbows are positioned slightly below shoulder height. The arms move the same arc as a bench fly, relative to the torso.

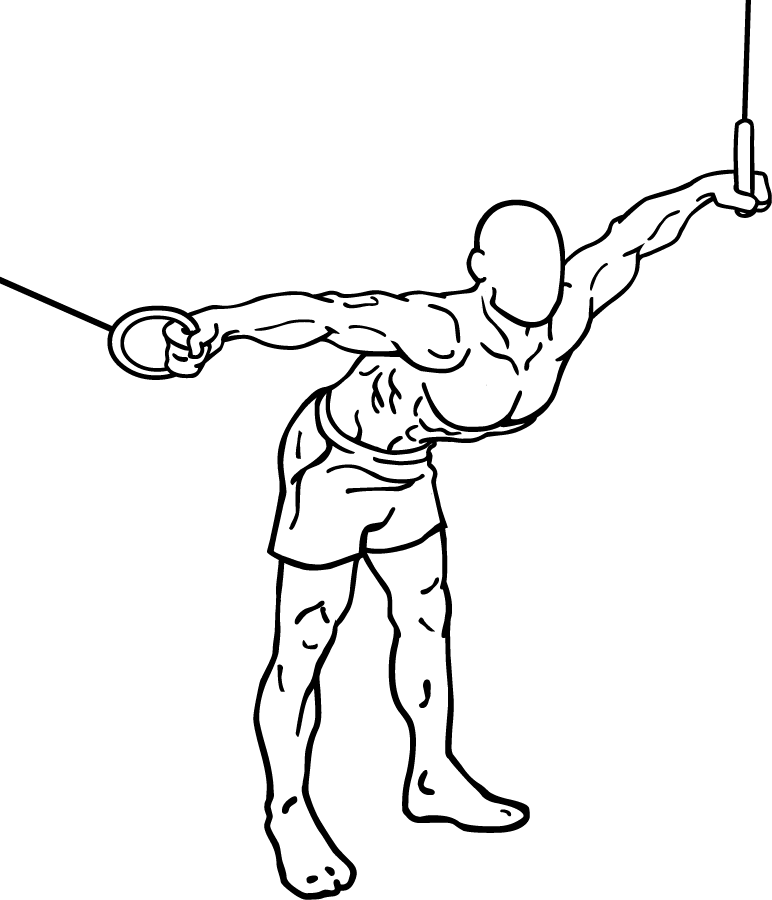
Cable crossover fly start

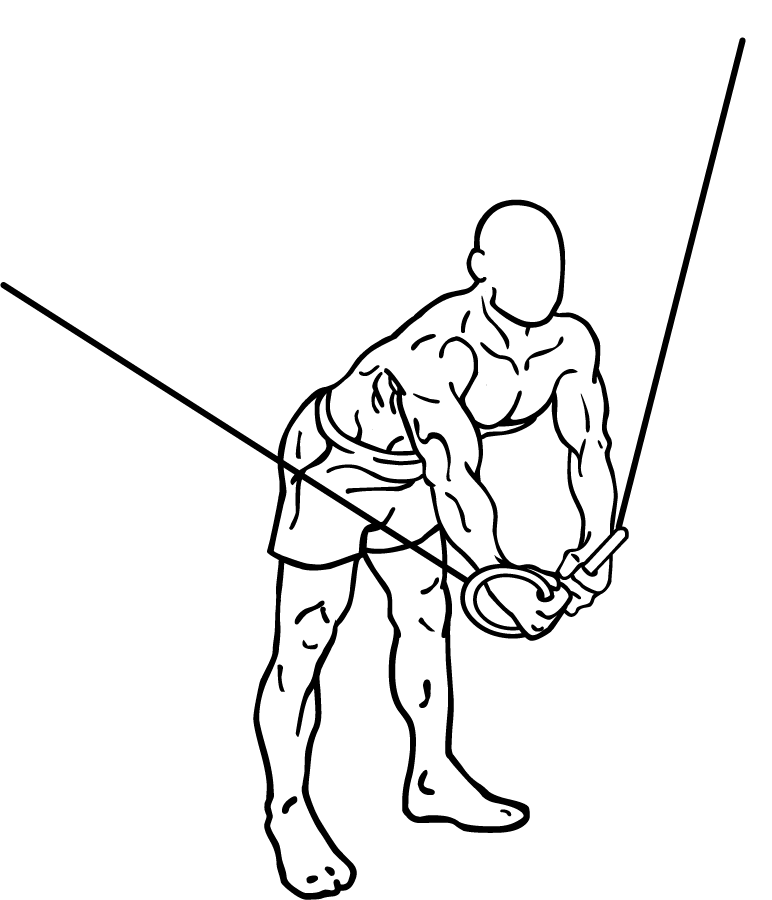
Cable crossover fly end

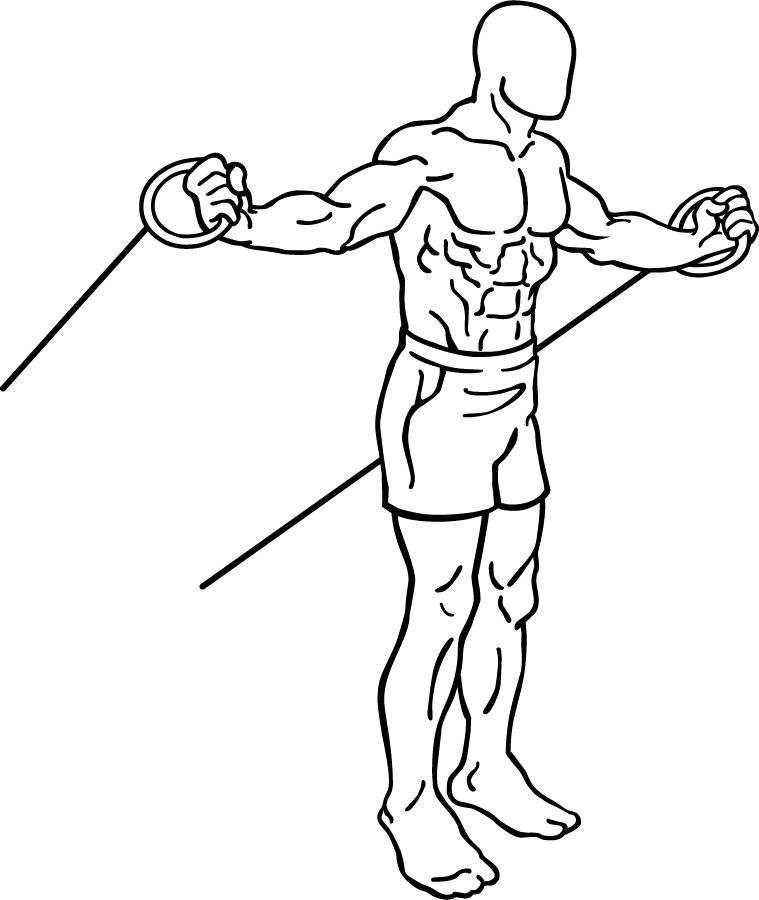
Crossover w/bands start

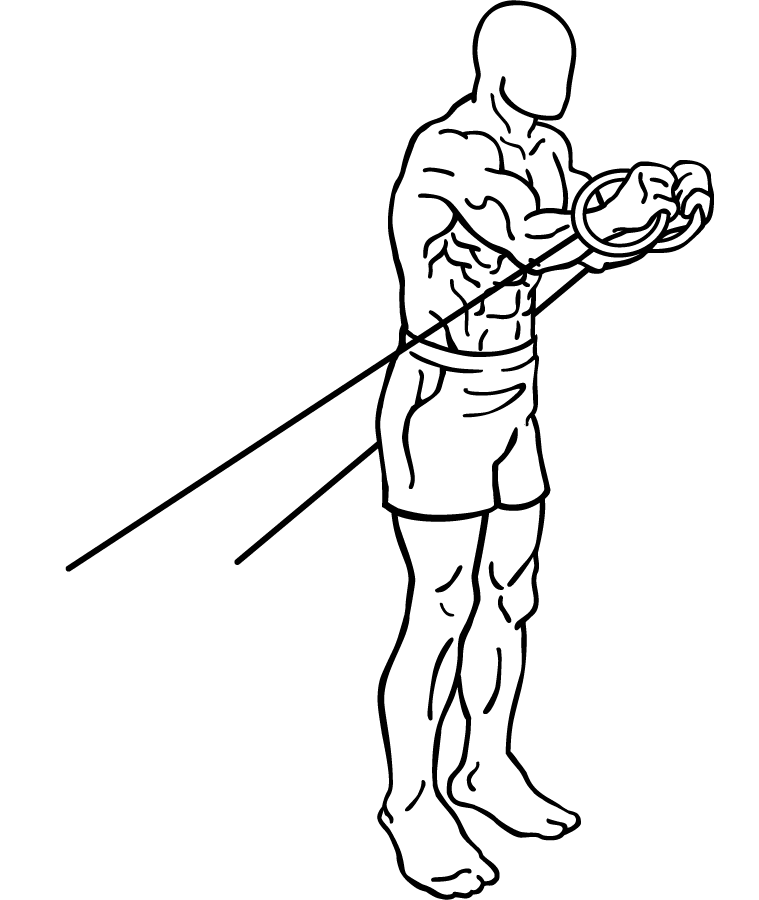
Crossover w/bands end

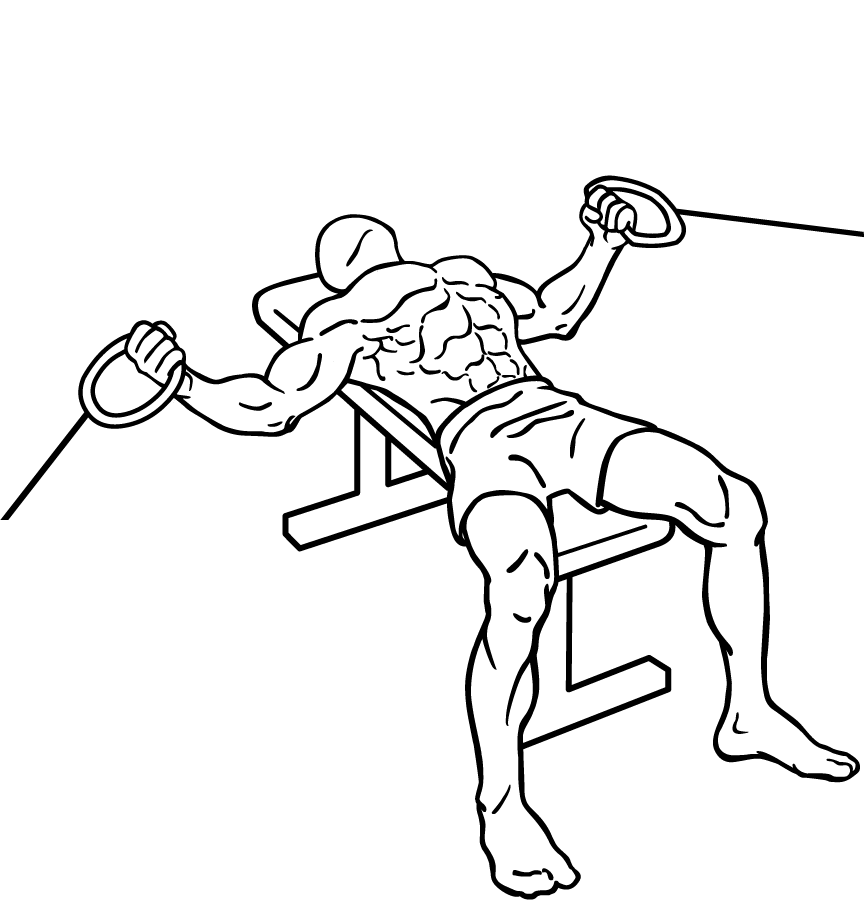
Lying cable fly start

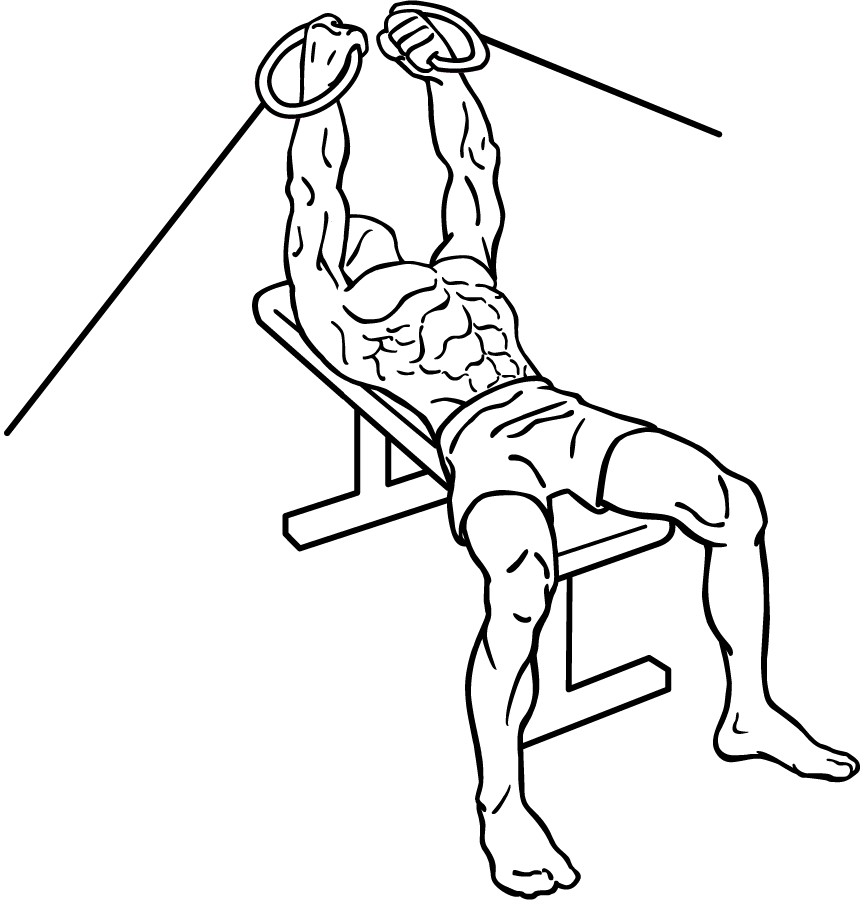
Lying cable fly end

==== Incline ====
The clavicular portion of the pectoralis major is targeted through incline flies, when the arms rise upward as they adduct.

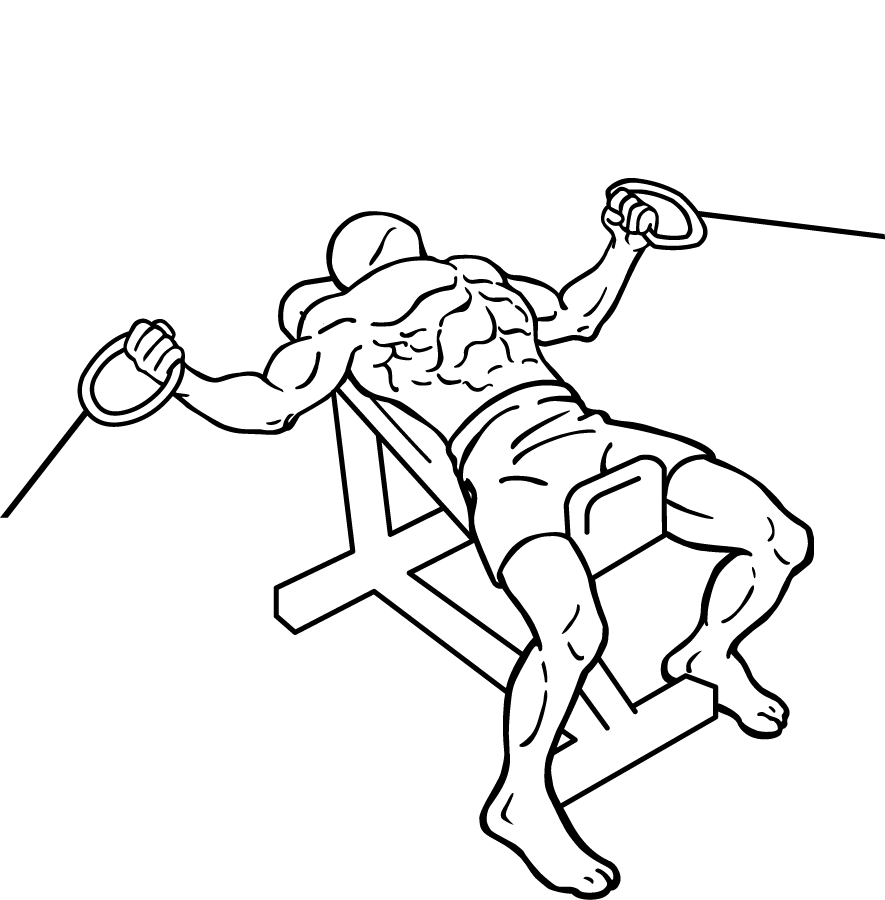
Incline cable fly start

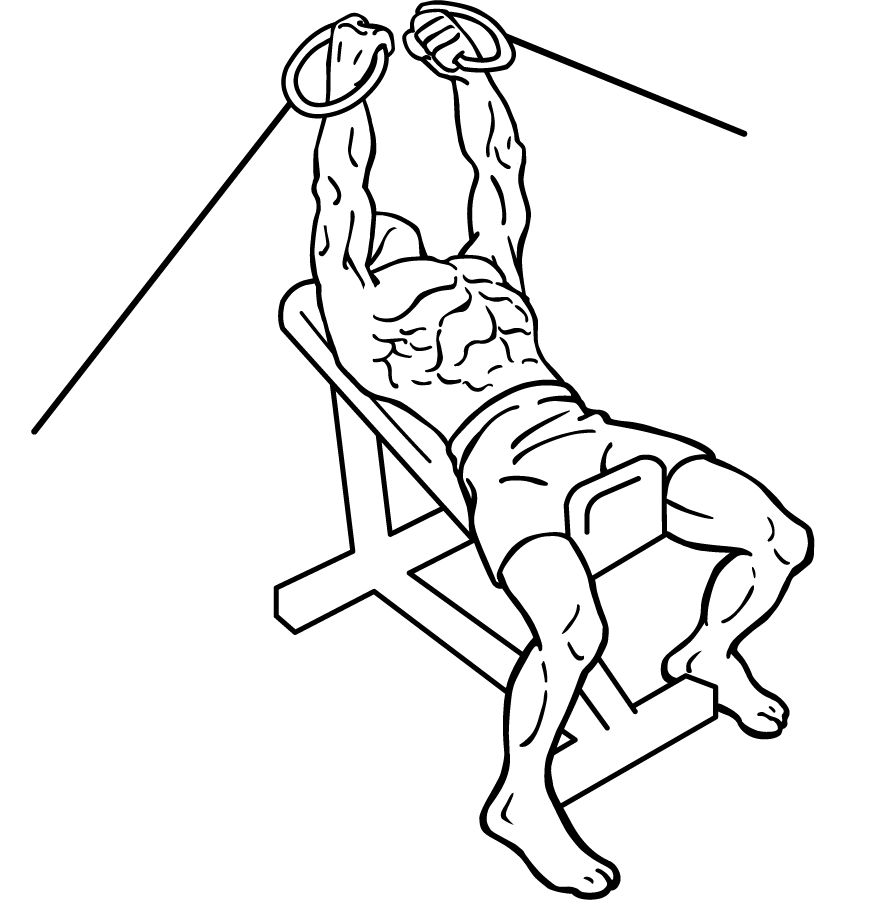
Incline cable fly end

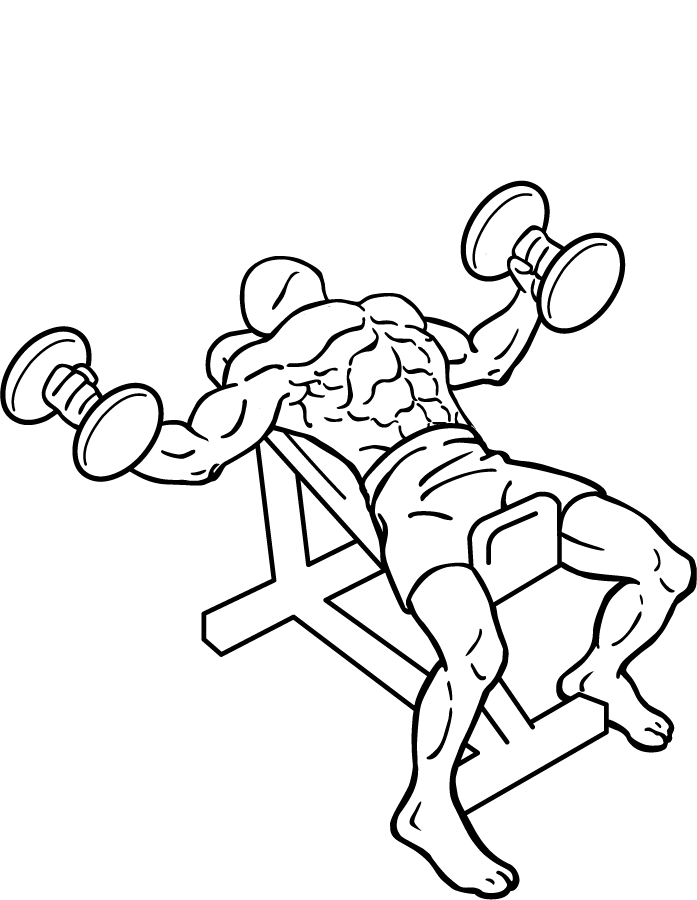
Incline dumbbell fly start

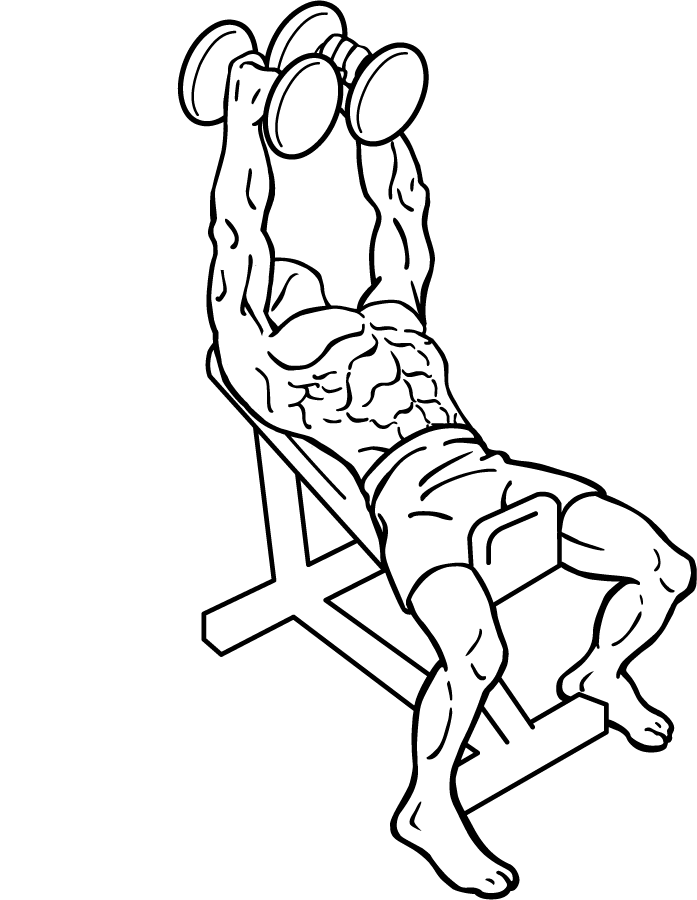
Incline dumbbell fly end

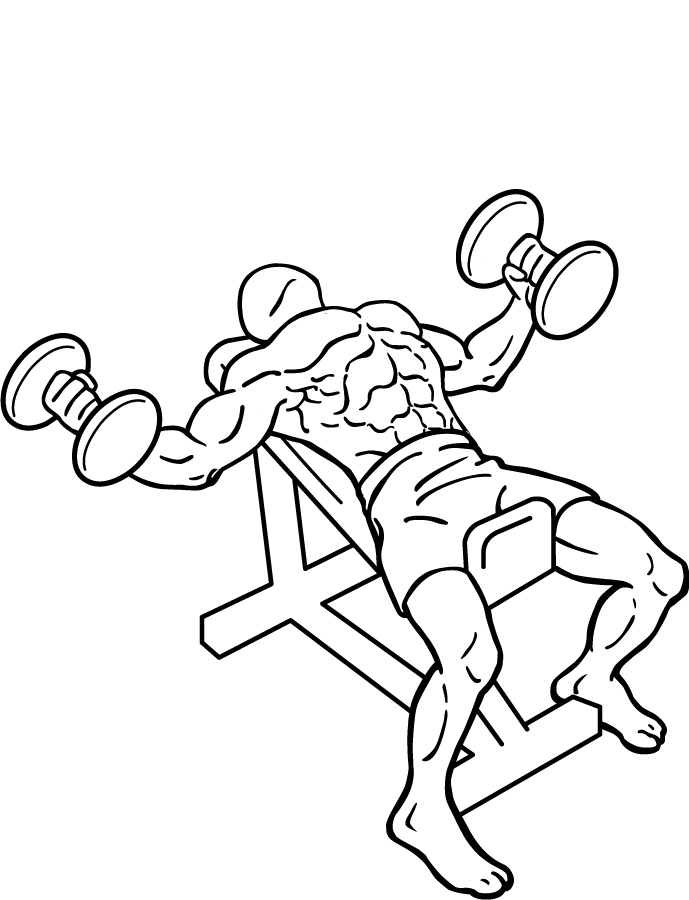
Twisting fly start

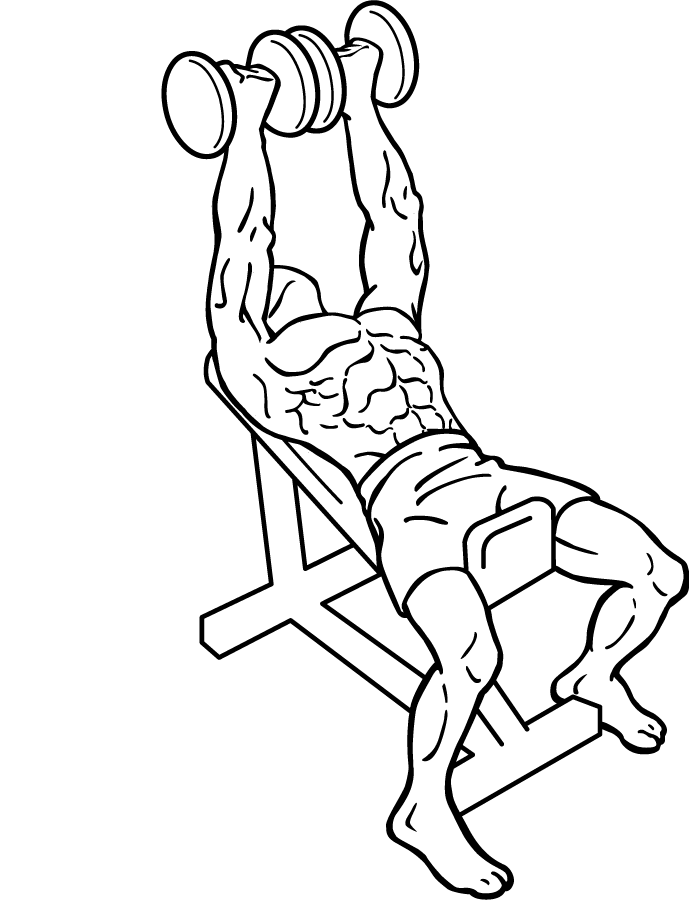
Twisting fly end

In flies the shoulders are sometimes externally (laterally) rotated to point the elbows down to shift emphasis away from use of the anterior deltoid as a transverse adductor. Recordsetter World Record holder Jason Faulkner (Incredible Faulk) is featured in a video Completing 47 lifts with 65 Lb. Dumbbells in 1 minute. This surpasses Eamonn Keane's Guinness Record by 1,200 Pounds for Most weight Incline fly lifted in 1 minute.

=== Inverted fly ===
The inverted fly (also known as a bent-over lateral raise, reverse fly, or rear delt fly) works the posterior deltoid. This movement is the opposite of a chest fly. The exercise is performed with the torso parallel to the ground, facing down, with the hands in front of the face. Arms are moved through the transverse plane in an arc until parallel to the ground (or the limit of the range of motion of the shoulder is reached), then returned to the starting position and repeated.

In terms of glenohumeral movement, the posterior deltoid does not work alone, and is assisted by other muscles. If the shoulder is neutrally rotated (elbows pointing outward then towards the scapulae as they lift) the posterior deltoid will be assisted in this transverse extension by the lateral rotators of the rotator cuff: the infraspinatus and teres minor. If the shoulder is externally rotated (elbows pointing towards the hips) then it will be assisted in this transverse abduction by the middle deltoid head.

This fly, while it seems like an isolation movement, is actually a compound movement because it involves movement in a second joint: the scapulothoracic. The scapulae will retract (adduct) during this type of fly. The muscles that perform this function are the rhomboids and the trapezius.

If the lifter drops their elbows closer to their hips (rather than bringing them outward) the latissimus dorsi will come into play and deemphasize the use of the aforementioned muscles that cross both joints, as the lats bypass the scapulae and attach directly to the lumbar fascia.

A variation involves sitting upright and using a cable machine; the machine is next to the shoulder opposite the muscle being worked (in line with the coronal plane), and the hand moves through the transverse plane across the front of the body at approximately eye level.

=== Lateral raise ===
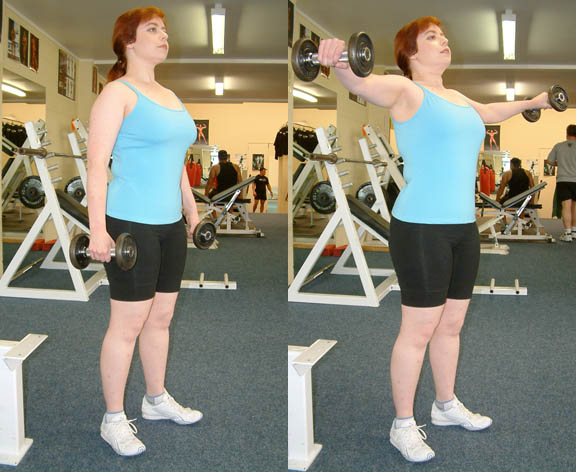
Dumbbell shoulder fly

The shoulder fly (also known as a lateral raise) works the deltoid muscle of the shoulder. The movement starts with the arms straight, and the hands holding weights at the sides or in front of the body. Body is in a slight forward-leaning position with hips and knees bent a little. Arms are kept straight or slightly bent, and raised through an arc of movement in the coronal plane that terminates when the hands are at approximately shoulder height. Weights are lowered to the starting position, completing one "rep". When using a cable machine the individual stands with the coronal plane in line with the pulley, which is at or near the ground. The exercise can be completed one shoulder at a time (with the other hand used to stabilize the body against the weight moved), or with both hands simultaneously if two parallel pulleys are available.

This movement, when the shoulder is kept in neutral rotation, primarily targets the middle head of the deltoid. The anterior (front) and posterior (back) heads of the deltoid will also co-contract to aid in the abduction function. If the shoulder is laterally (externally, outwardly) rotated, the anterior deltoid becomes the prime mover of the glenohumeral joint, the posterior deltoid de-activates, and the middle head assists. By bending at the waist or leaning against a bench, the line of pull created allows the lateral deltoid to be isolated to a higher degree.

If repetitions are done explosively, it is possible for form to deteriorate and other muscles may come into play to do work instead of the deltoid, by generating upward and rotation momentum. The muscles which can be used to "cheat" in this movement are primarily the serratus anterior and the upper fibers of the trapezius, both of which elevate and upwardly rotate the scapulae.

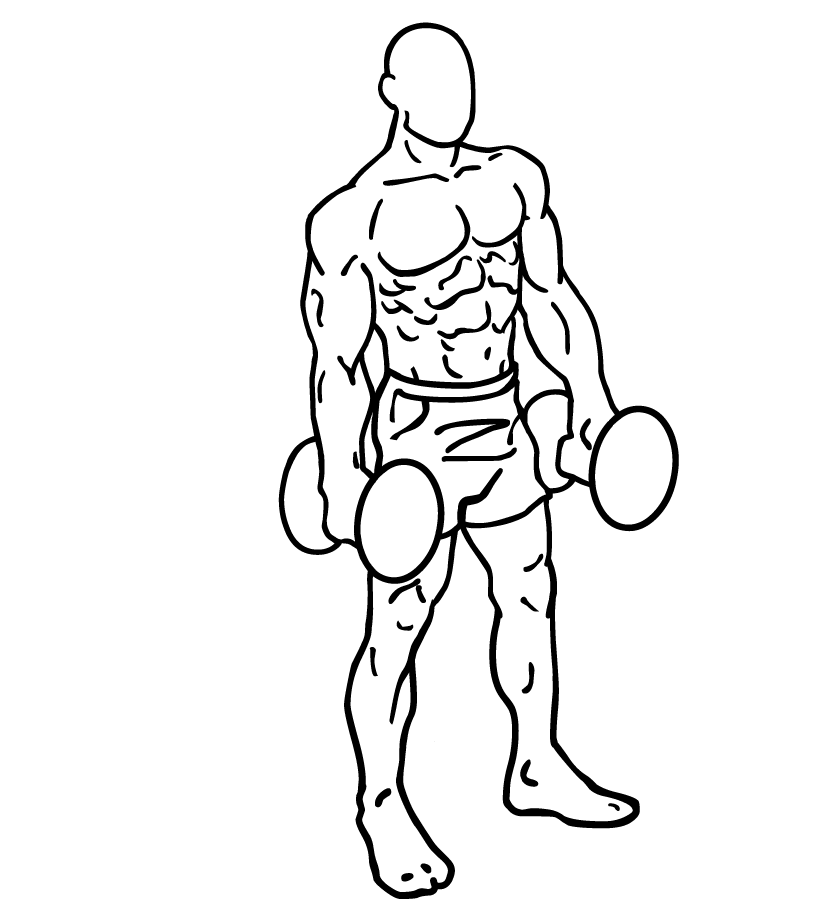

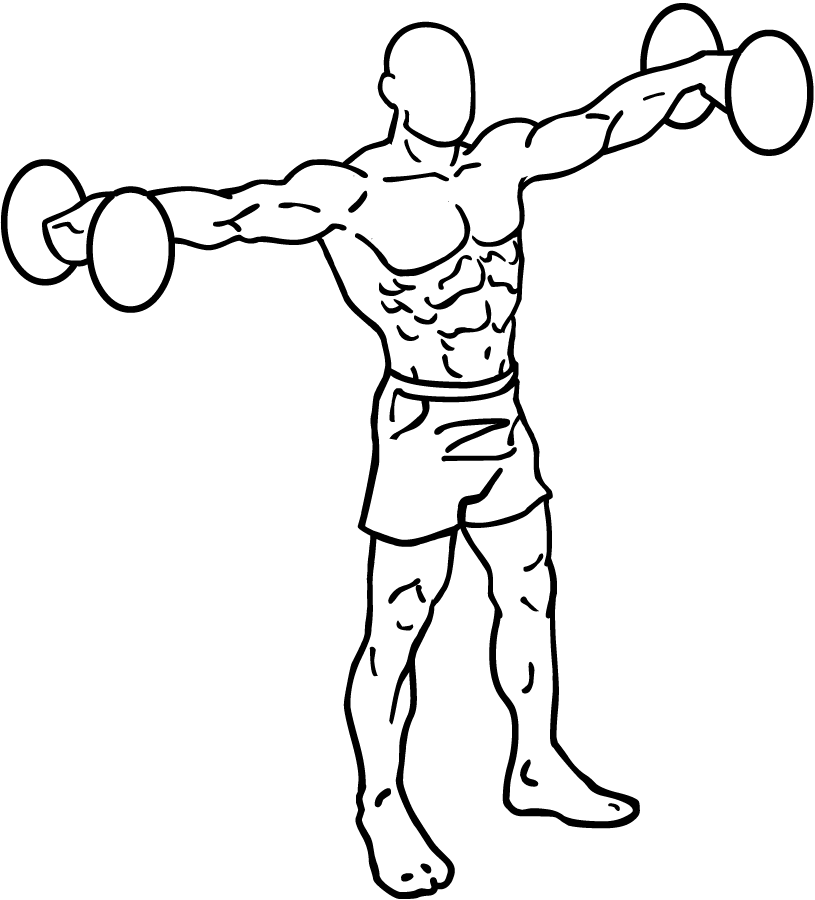

==== Common errors ====
- External rotation of shoulder – If external rotation occurs during the lift, the rotatory cuff muscles are activated. If the weight is lifted while the shoulder is in the externally rotated position, the anterior deltoid does all the work. In both cases, utilisation of the lateral deltoid is decreased to a great extent thereby defeating the purpose of the exercise.
- Shoulder extension – Shoulder extension occurs when the elbows travel behind the shoulders during the lift. This movement, too, decreases the utilisation of the lateral deltoids.
- Throwing the weight up – Using the hips or spine to generate momentum also lessens the emphasis on the lateral deltoids.
- Complete upright position – Keeping the body totally straight increases the chances of the anterior deltoid being used.
- Arms locked out at extension – This puts stress on joints which can lead to injury. Instead keep a slight bend in elbows.

== See also ==
- Bent-over row – a compound alternative to a reverse fly
- Machine fly – the machine version of the chest fly
- Supine row – a bodyweight, compound alternative to a reverse fly
- Upright row – a compound alternative to a shoulder fly
