= Front raise =

Weight training exercise

The front raise exercise is used in weight training. It primarily works the anterior deltoid and the clavicular head of the pectoralis major through the use of arm abduction and flexion through the frontal plane. The training volume, or number of sets and repetitions performed, depends on the lifter's training program and goals.

== Form ==
To execute the exercise, the lifter stands with their feet shoulder width apart and weights or resistance handles held by their side with a pronated (overhand) grip. The movement is to bring the arms up in front of the body to eye level and with only a slight bend in the elbow.

== Gallery ==
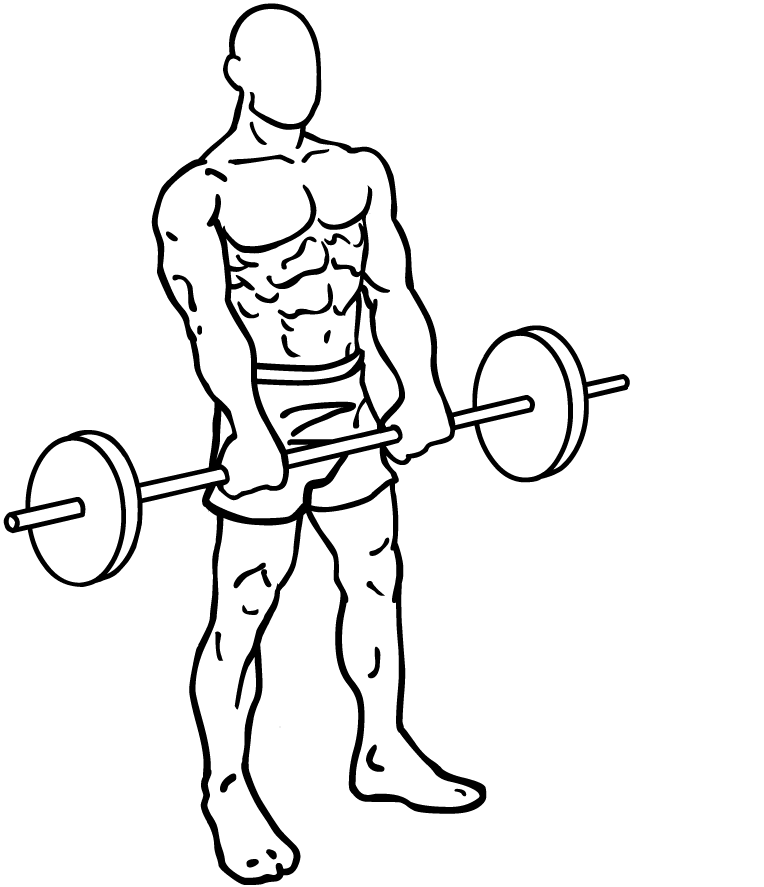
Barbell raise start

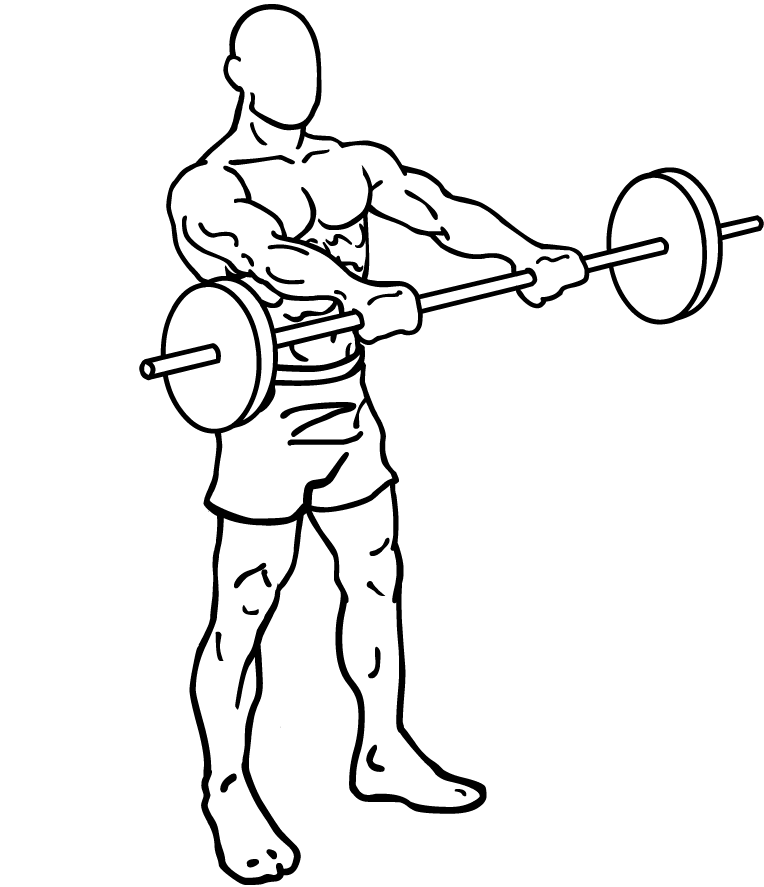
Barbell raise end

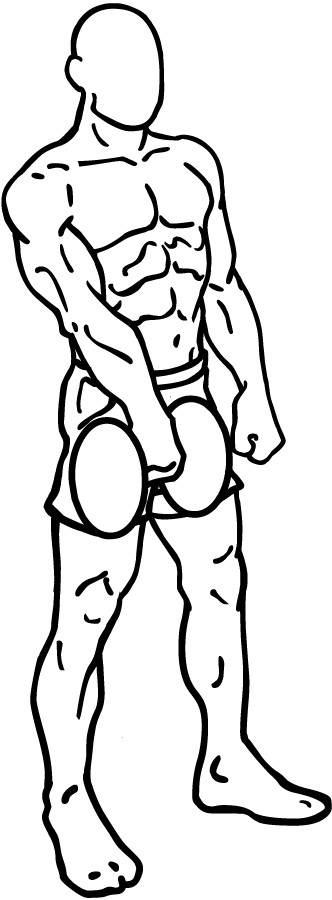
Dumbbell raise start

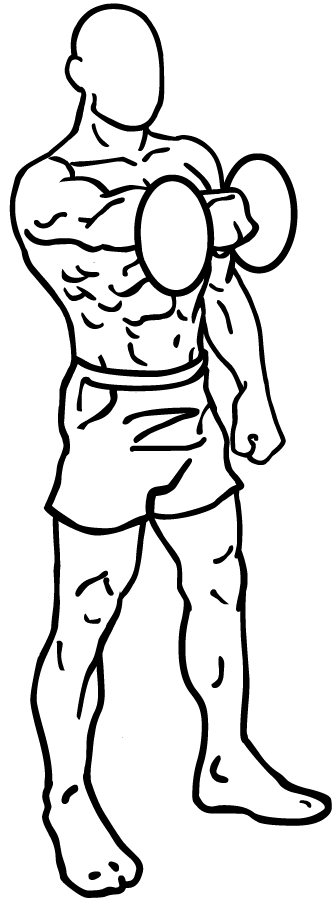
Dumbbell raise end

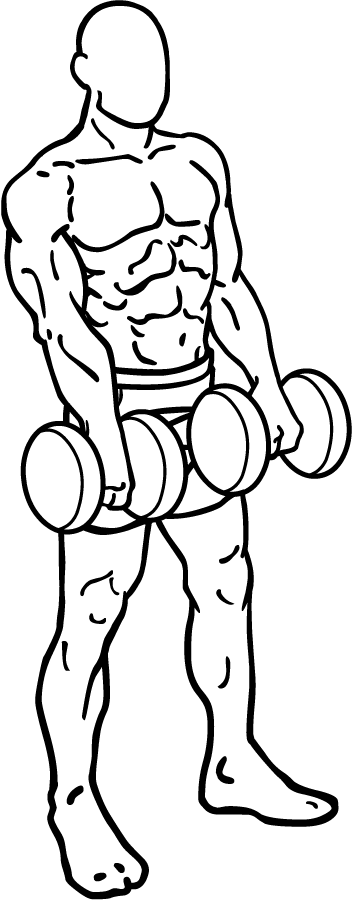
With both hands simultaneously

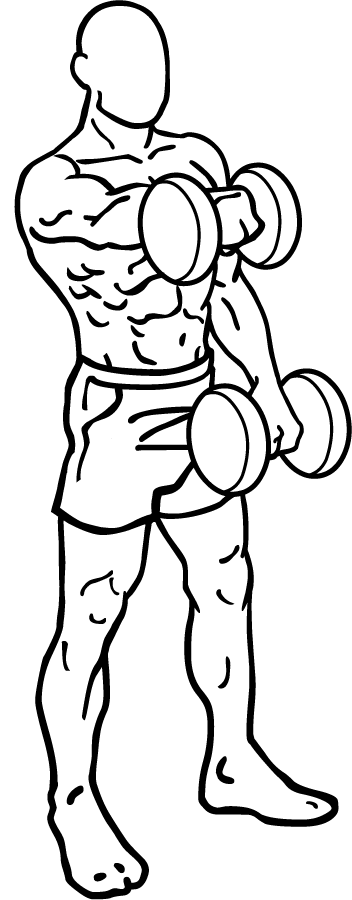
