= Inverted row =

Weight training exercise

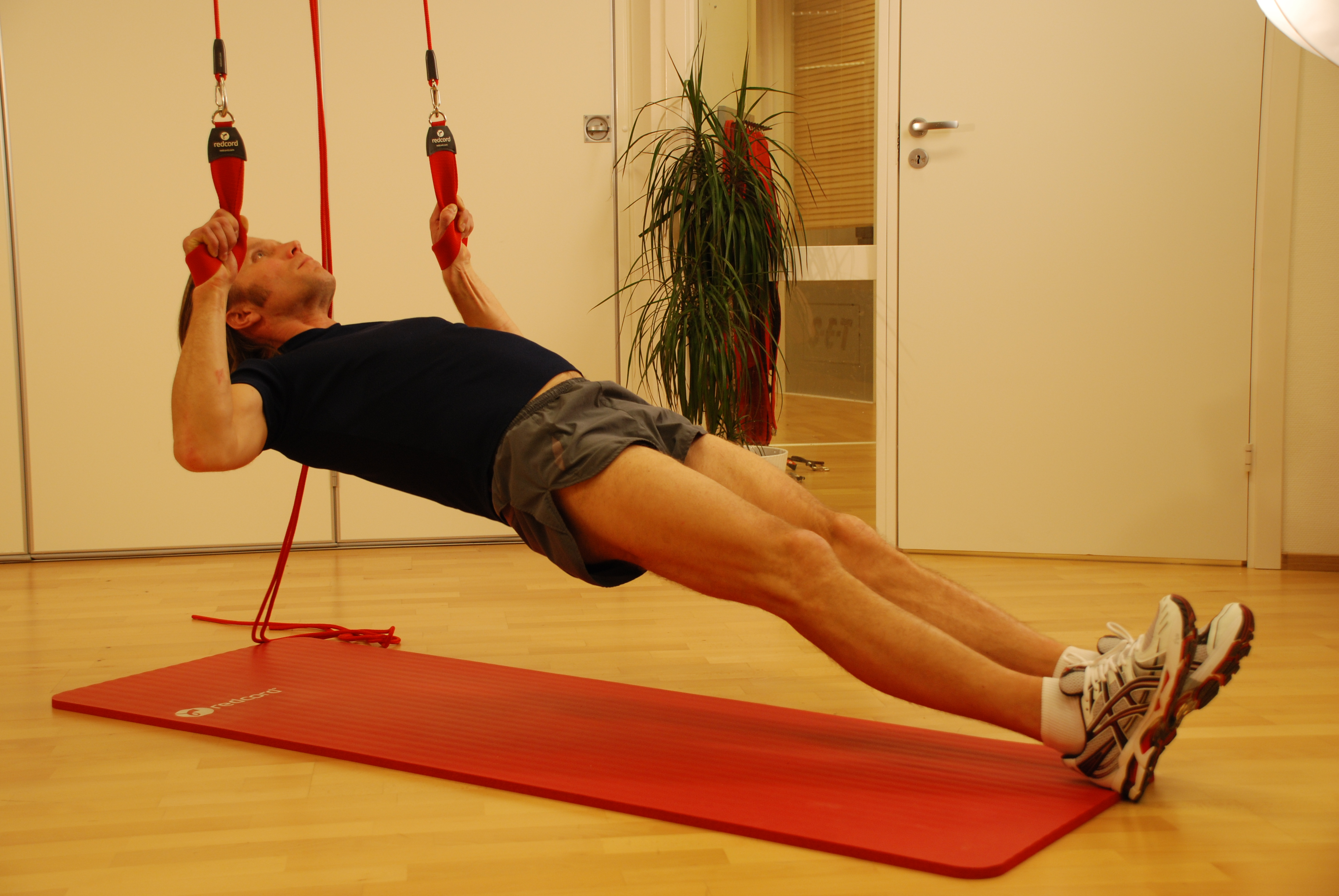
Man performing an inverted row with a suspension trainer

The inverted row is an exercise in calisthenics. It primarily works the muscles of the upper back—the trapezius and latissimus dorsi—as well as the biceps as a secondary muscle group. The supine row is normally carried out in three to five sets, but repetitions depend on the type of training a lifter is using to make their required gains. This exercise is lighter on the joints compared to weighted rows. The exercise can also be performed with mixed, underhand, or overhand grips with either wide or narrow hand placement.

One study showed that the inverted row activated the latissimus dorsi muscles, upper back, and hip extensor muscles more than the standing bent-over row and also resulted in less load on the lower spine area, which makes the exercises preferable for people with lower-back issues compared to other rowing exercises.

== Form ==
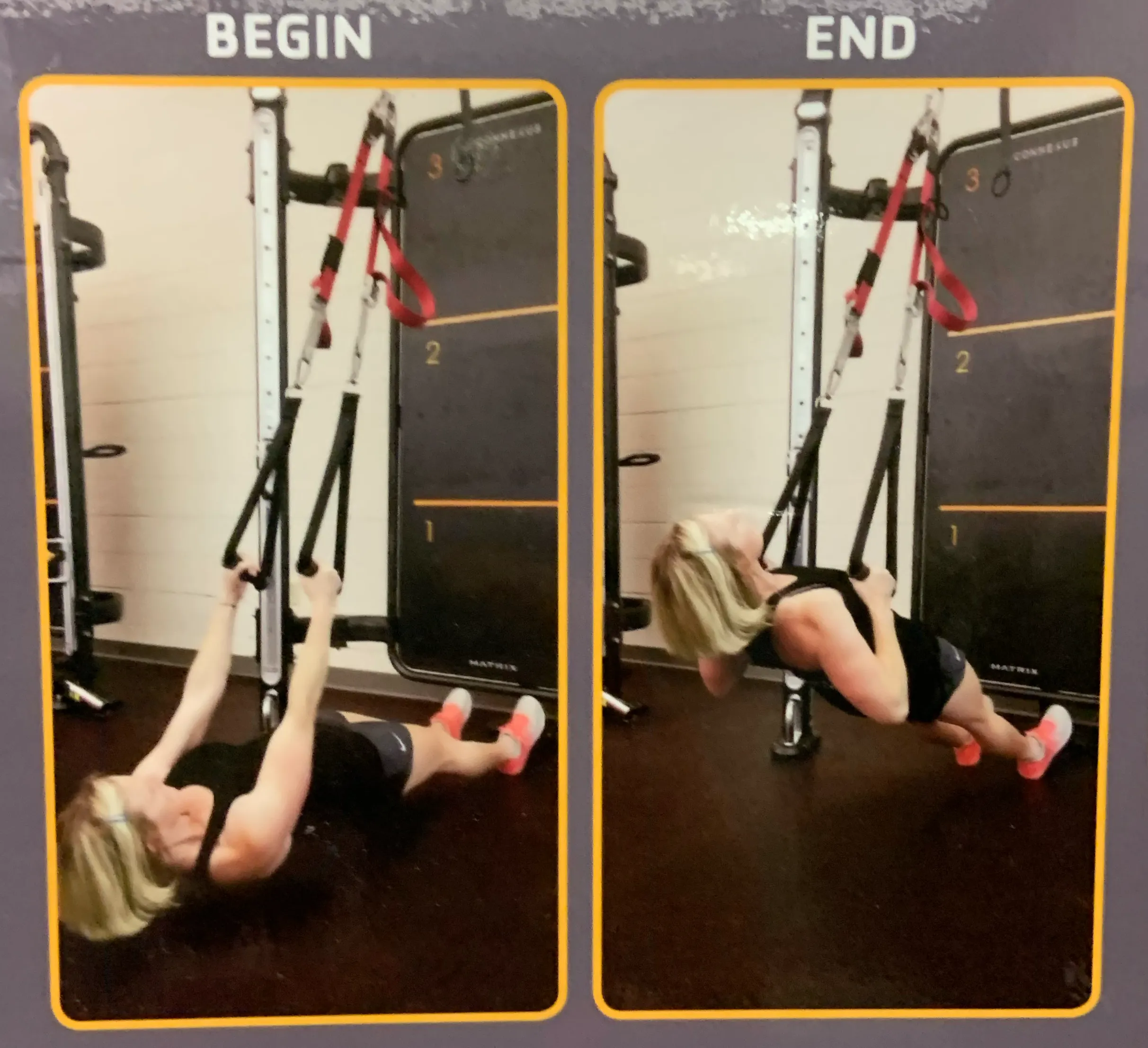
Suspension training with TRX bands

To execute the exercise, the lifter lies flat on the ground under a fixed bar (such as a Smith machine set at chest height). The lifter holds the bar with an overhand grip, straight arms, straight body, upper body hanging with heels on the ground close together. The lifter pulls the chest toward the bar until it touches, before returning to the starting position under control. Good form means that the body is kept straight throughout the movement. The chin should remain tucked during the motion, keeping the cervical portion of the spine lined up with the rest of the body.

The bar can be moved higher or lower to make the movement easier or more difficult. The lower the bar is, the more difficult the movement becomes.

The exercise can be performed in a home environment with the help of two chairs and a bar (for example a mop handle).
