= Bent-over row =

Weight training exercise

A bent-over row (or barbell row) is a weight training exercise that targets a variety of back muscles depending on the form used. It usually targets the back muscles, and the arm muscles. It is often used for both bodybuilding and powerlifting.

== Implements ==
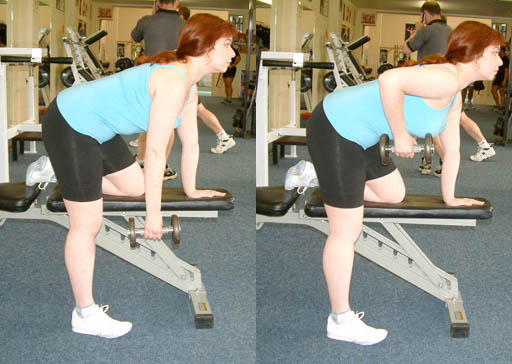
A one arm bent-over dumbbell row with a bench used as support.

There are several variants of this exercise, depending on whether dumbbells or a barbell is used and whether both arms are exercised at the same time:

Two arm rows:

- Two-arm barbell bent-over-row: This version uses both arms to lift a barbell to the stomach in a bent-forward position. The hands are kept pronated and the back straight.
- Two-arm dumbbell bent-over-row: The barbell is replaced by two dumbbells, one for each hand.
- Pendlay row: named after Glenn Pendlay; the back is parallel to the ground and the weight lifted from the floor, however because ones back is parallel with the floor, the barbell may hit the floor before one achieves a peak stretch on their back. Some may find a better stretch in their back if they stand on an elevated surface when doing Pendlay rows.
- Yates row: named after Dorian Yates; a row done with underhand grip and a slightly more upright torso than a regular row.
- Two-arm smith machine bent-over-row: This version is similar to the two arm barbell row but utilizes a smith machine bar instead of a barbell, allowing for safer and more controlled movements.
- Helms row: This row, made by Dr.Eric Helms, has a lifter brace their chest against an incline bench with two dumbbells in their hands. A lifter would then left the dumbbells up until the back is fully contracted, then lower the dumbbells until the back is fully stretched. Some use this row variation because it locks them in and allows them to overload the back without worrying about balance.

One arm rows:

- One arm dumbbell bent-over-row: This exercise is frequently performed with one knee and one hand on the same side of the body braced on a utility bench with the back straight and parallel to the ground, and the other hand holding a weight with the arm extended. The weight is lifted towards the hip until elbow bends past 90° and the humerus is in line with the back, then lowered to the original position.
- One arm barbell bent-over row: Done in a nearly identical fashion as the one arm dumbbell, but with the added instability of a long bar. This necessitated greater work by the radial and ulnar flexors of the wrist to stabilize while pulling. It also gives greater feedback about the pronation and supination as the movement of the bar is very visible.
- Kroc row: Named after Janae Marie Kroc who popularized them, Kroc rows are one-arm, heavy weight and high repetition rows that often call for grip compensating straps at extremely heavy weights up to around 140 kg (300 lbs).
- Medows row: Named after former bodybuilder Jhon Medows, the Medows row consists of a barbell attached to a landmind accessory that locks one end of the barbell into place. A lifter stands in front of the end of the barbell, bends over, grab the end with one hand, raise it until back is fully contracted, then lowers it till fully lengthened.
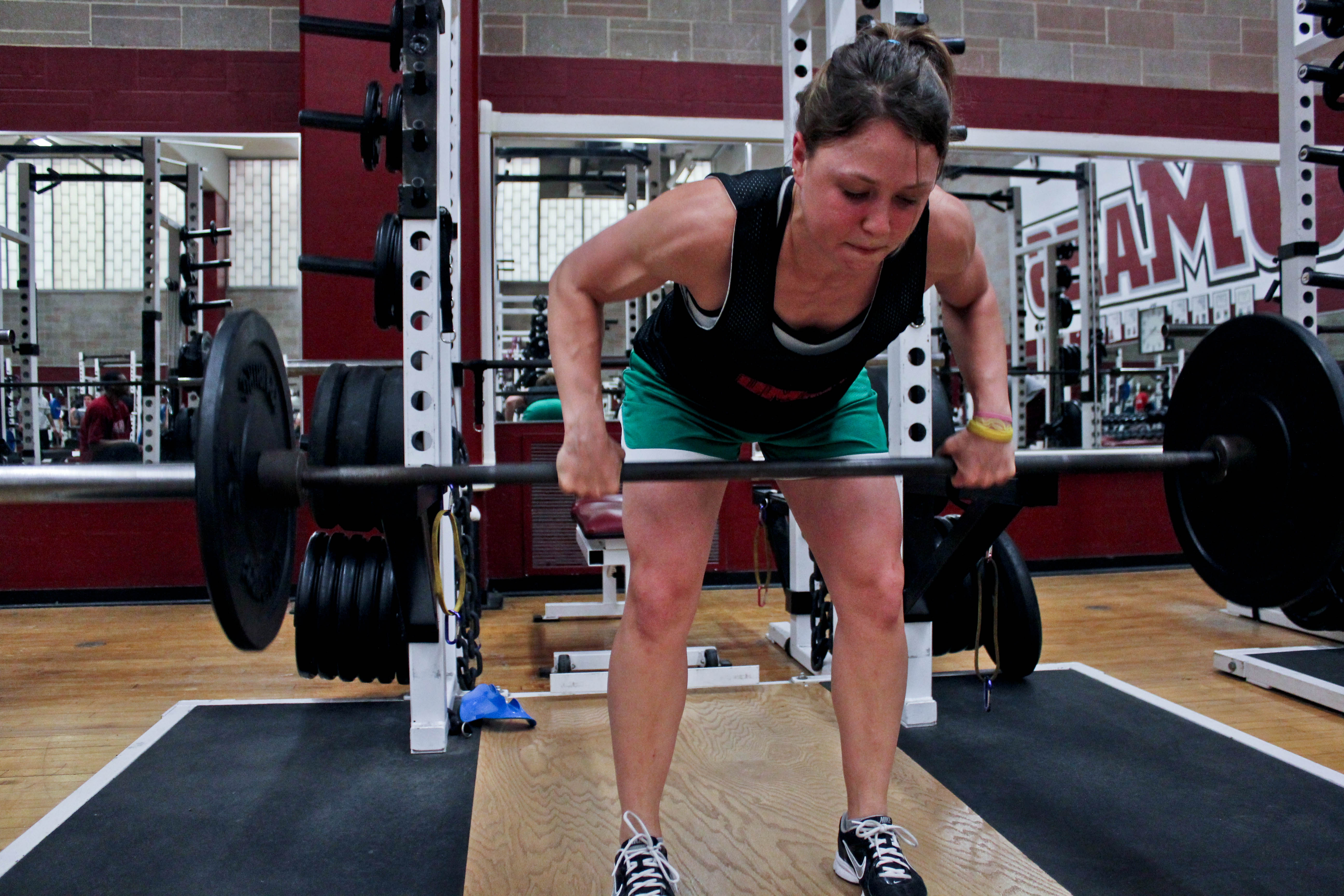
A standing bent-over barbell row with overhand grip

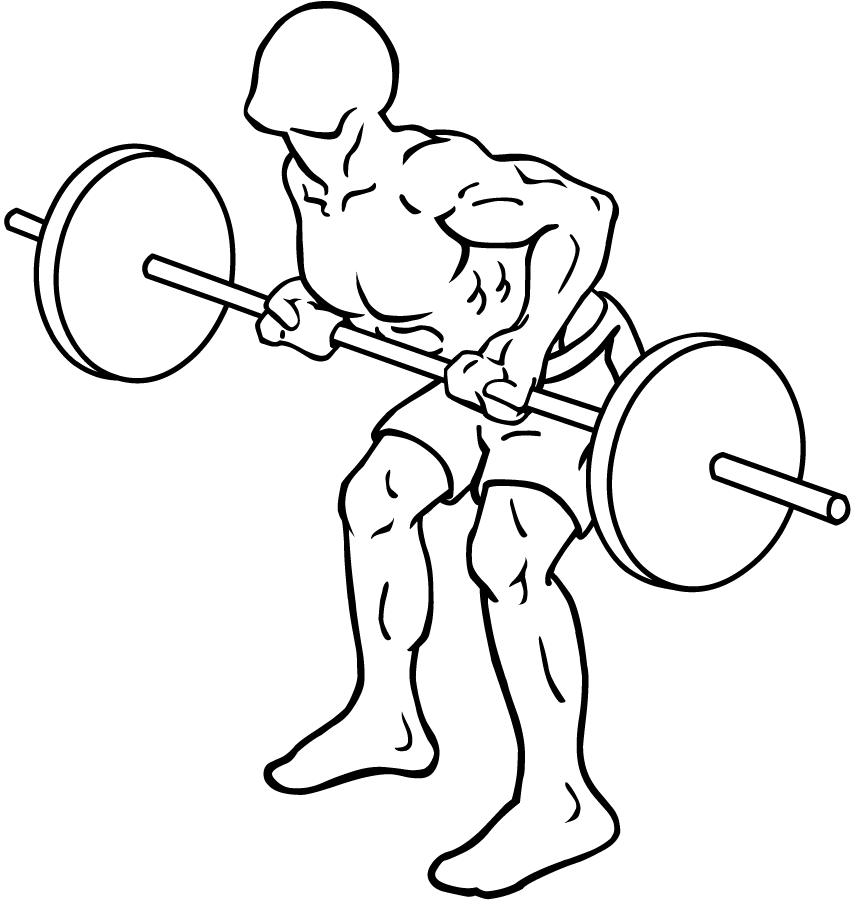
With an underhand grip, ending

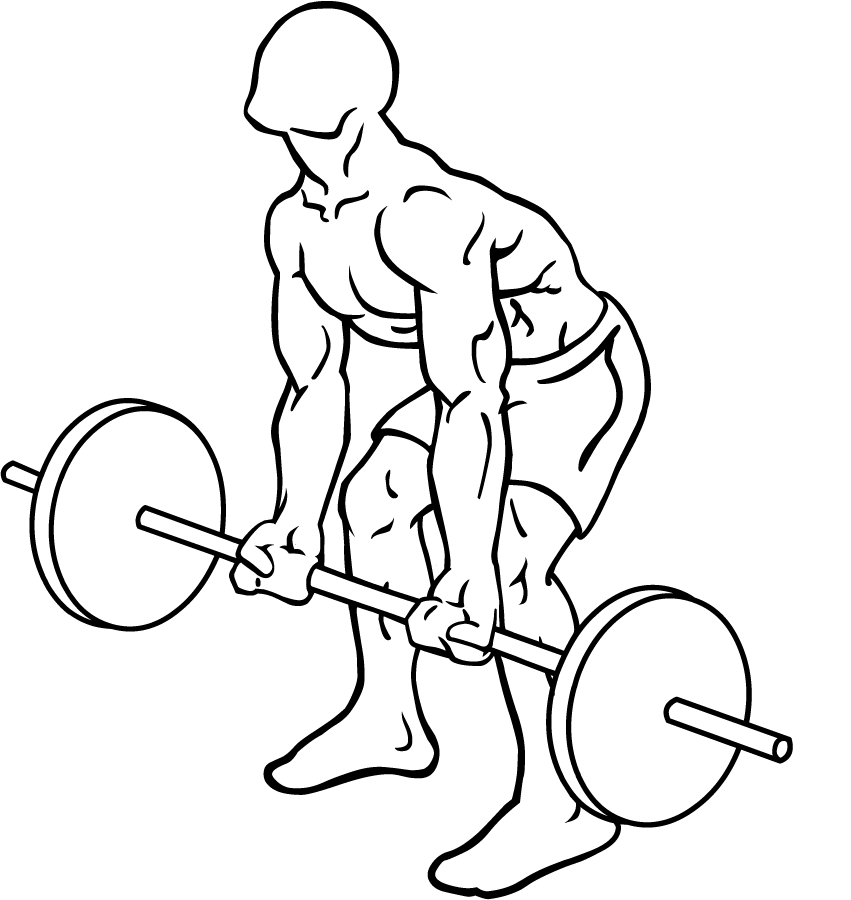
Underhand grip row starting

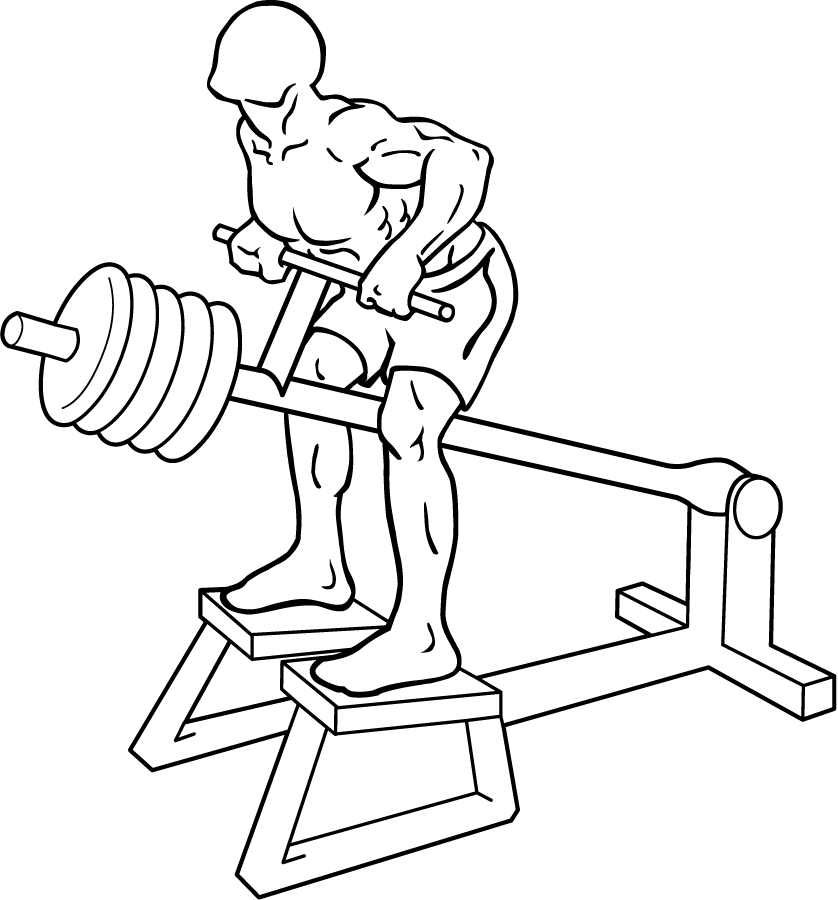
T-bar row end

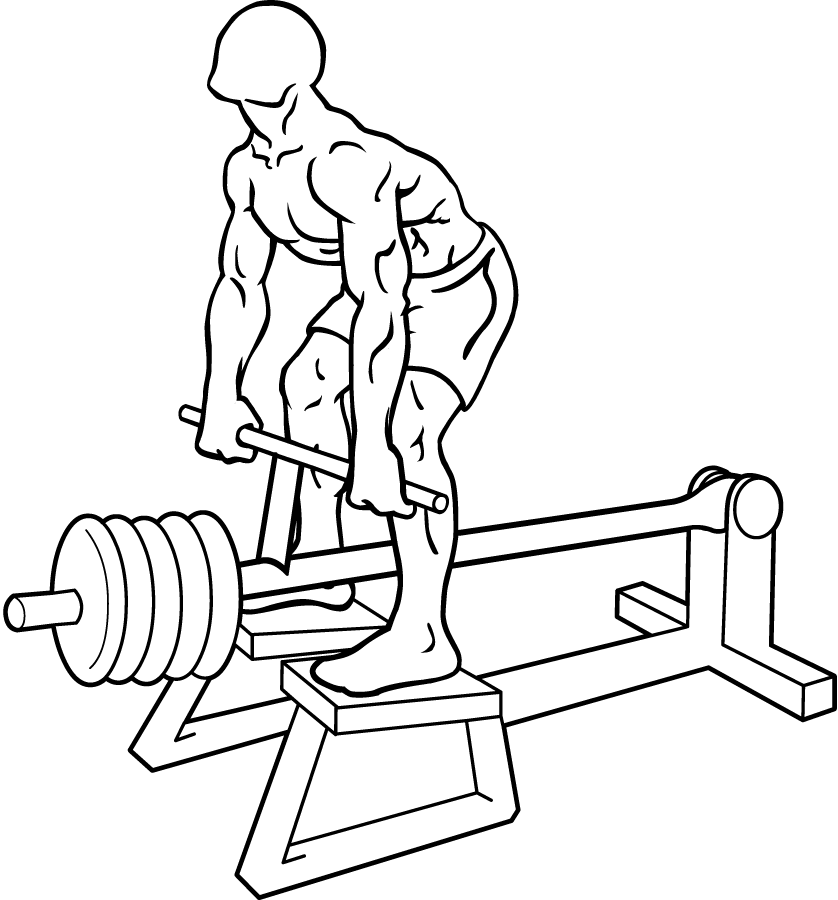
T-bar row start

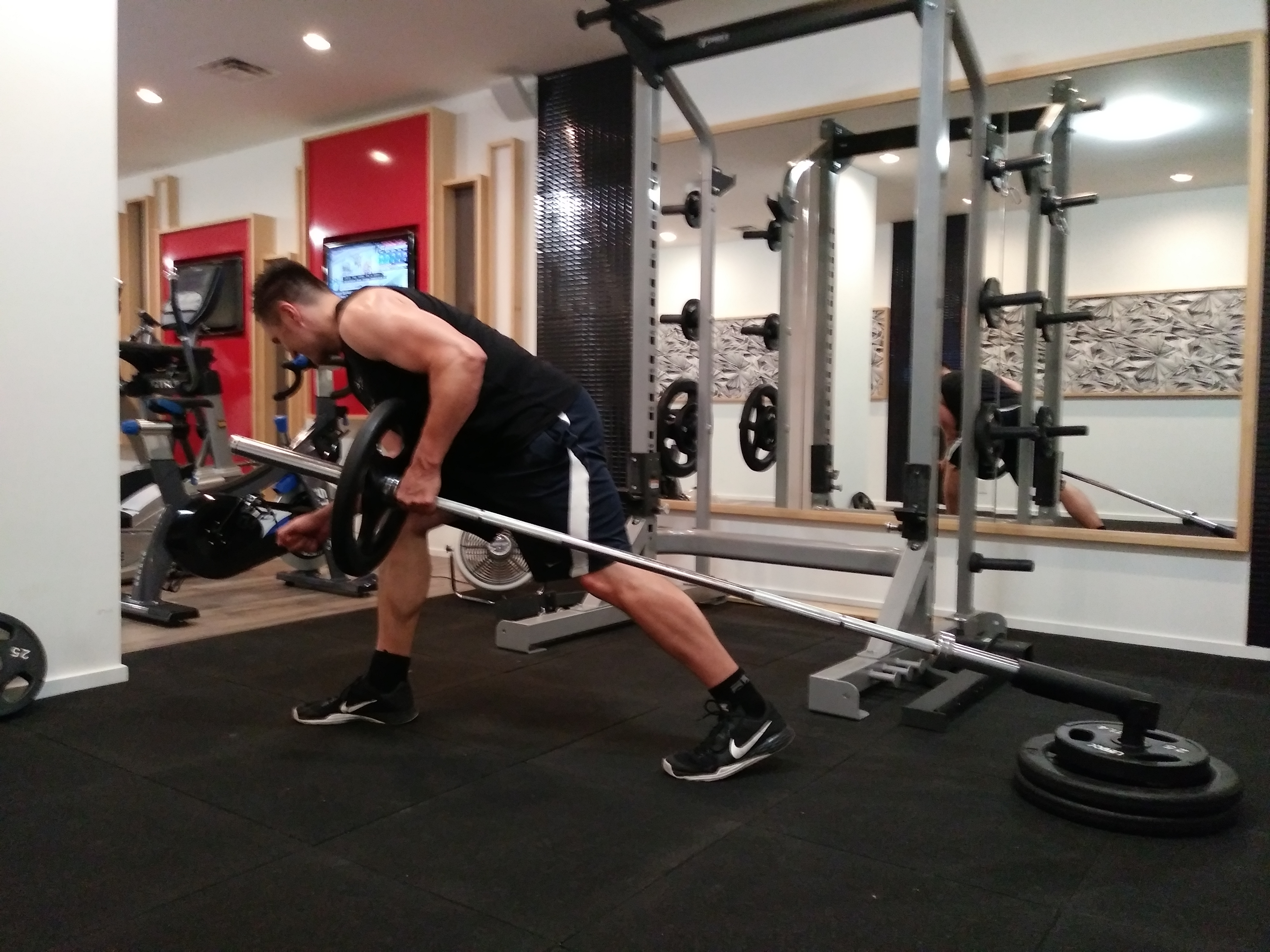
One-arm row with barbell

== Form variations ==
The muscles emphasized in the pulling movement vary based on form:

- The latissimus dorsi muscle is best targeted with the elbow close to the torso, bringing it to the hip. It is assisted by the lower trapezius fibers in adducting the scapula. The latissimus dorsi originates in a fascia of the lower back, so the mass is pulled to a place closer to the pelvis. This reduces the amount of work the lower back has to do.
- The transverse extensors (posterior deltoid muscle fibers and the infraspinatus and teres minor of the rotator cuff), along with scapular retractors such as the rhomboids and entire trapezius, are better targeted when the elbows are brought outwards. This increases the demands on the lower back as the weight is pulled to a point further away from the pelvis.
- The lateral deltoid can be involved alongside the posterior deltoids by rowing at a 45-degree angle with forearms hanging straight down and upper arms perpendicular to the body through the range of motion. This form has with similar muscle activation to lateral raises.

A medium between the extremes can also be done, such as pulling to a 45-degree angle. Form can easily switch between the two when done with dumbbells. A pronated forearm and a wide grip on a barbell encourages an elbows-out row, while a supinated forearm and a narrow grip on the barbell encourages an elbows-in row.

== Safety ==
Chances of being injured are increased when a lifter deviates from safer postures. Adopting a stable form and alignment can be difficult for many to learn. Being supervised by someone experienced in doing the lift can benefit beginners who would not be aware of unsafe postures. Some things that people do with the desire of safety are:

- Keeping the abs tense to support the back. This likely means contraction of the transversus abdominis, as contraction of the rectus abdominis would cause the back to round and de-activate the lower back.
- Allowing bend in the knees: this lowers the center of gravity and the pelvis is brought closer to the ground. It can decrease stretch in the hamstrings, and make it easier to pick a weight off the ground. It also makes it easier to set the weight down as dropping it would be riskier.
- Maintaining an arch (a slight concavity) in the spine for a healthy lower back.
- Starting out by lifting lower weights to build endurance in the lower back as well as the upper pulling muscles. Upper back muscles often have a lot of slow-twitch fibers so bent-over rows can respond better than some exercises that use muscles with a higher ratio of fast-twitch fibers.
- Doing the exercise with a slow tempo and avoiding jerking. This allows stricter attention to be paid to form by observing deviations throughout the lift and keeping the hips and spine more stable. This also prevents momentum from creating momentary weightlessness or slack in the muscles during the ascent, or from creating a jerking catch on the bottom of the lift if it is dropped quickly.
