= Ponnampalam Memorial hospital bombing =

Sri Lankan air force bombing in december of 2008

Ponnampalam Memorial Hospital
- Part of Sri Lankan Civil War
- Location: Puthukudiyiruppu, Mullaitivu District, Sri Lanka
- Date: 6 February 2009
- Attack type: Artillery fire, and aerial attack
- Weapons: Artillery, aircraft fire
- Deaths: 61
- Perpetrators: Sri Lankan Airforce and Sri Lankan army

Ponnampalam Memorial Hospital is located in Puthukudiyiruppu in the Mullaitivu District. It was run by the LTTE in rebel-controlled areas. In 2009, it was bombed by the Sri Lankan airforce and the hospital was destroyed. Human Rights Watch accused the Sri Lankan military of shelling hospitals in the Safe Zone indiscriminately with artillery and attacking them aerially beginning with the Mullaitivu General Hospital in December 2008 and subsequently at least eight other hospitals. Human Rights Watch stated that these attacks constitute war crimes. They've also indicated that the hospitals are clearly marked. Within the Report of the Secretary-General's Panel of Experts on Accountability in Sri Lanka it was determined that the allegations claiming the Sri Lankan military shelled hospitals were credible. Gotabaya Rajapakse stated that "No hospital should operate outside the Safety Zone...everything beyond the safety is a legitimate target". US Secretary of State Hillary Clinton and British Foreign Secretary David Miliband jointly called on the warring parties in the island of Sri Lanka "not to fire out of or into" the safe zone and in the "vicinity of Puthukkudiyiruppu (PTK) hospital or any other medical structure".
