= Contents of the United States diplomatic cables leak (Sri Lanka) =

Content from the United States diplomatic cables leak has depicted Sri Lanka and related subjects extensively. The leak, which began on 28 November 2010, occurred when the website of WikiLeaks—an international new media non-profit organisation that publishes submissions of otherwise unavailable documents from anonymous news sources and news leaks—started to publish classified documents of detailed correspondence—diplomatic cables—between the United States Department of State and its diplomatic missions around the world. Since the initial release date, WikiLeaks is releasing further documents every day. 3,166 of the 251,287 diplomatic cables obtained by WikiLeaks are from the US Embassy in Colombo, Sri Lanka.

== War crimes ==
In a cable dated 15 January 2010 on the subject of war crimes accountability, the US ambassador in Colombo Patricia A. Butenis implicated President Mahinda Rajapaksa in alleged war crimes committed in the final months of the Sri Lankan Civil War. Butenis pointed out "that responsibility for many of the alleged [war] crimes rests with the country's senior civilian and military leadership, including President Rajapaksa and his brothers (Gotabhaya Rajapaksa and Basil Rajapaksa) and opposition candidate General Fonseka. Butenis stated that only "few tentative steps" had been taken on accountability and that there was little likelihood of anyone being held accountable for the war crimes, stating "There are no examples ... of a regime undertaking wholesale investigations of its own troops or senior officials for war crimes while that regime or government remained in power".

Butenis believed that there was a difference of opinion between the Sri Lankan Tamils living in Sri Lanka and those in the diaspora as to how to pursue the accountability issue. For the diaspora accountability was a "top-priority" but Tamils in Sri Lanka were more "pragmatic in what they can expect". The Sri Lankan Tamils were more concerned with improving their rights, freedoms and economic prospects. They believed pushing for accountability was unrealistic and counter-productive. They were fearful of the repercussions if the war crimes issue was pursued aggressively but they hoped that the issue would be dealt with some time in the future.

Most Sri Lankan Tamil politicians were supportive of national reconciliation and ethnic cohesion. They feared "political or even physical attack" if they raised the issue of accountability and were focusing "on more immediate economic and social concerns". Rajavarothiam Sampanthan, leader of the Tamil National Alliance, the largest political party representing the Tamils, did not want to raise the war crimes issue in Parliament because he feared retaliation. Sampanthan believed it was important for the truth to be exposed but that the Tamils were "vulnerable" on the issue. Pathmini Sithamparanathan, a TNA MP with close links to the Tamil Tigers, believed that the truth about what happened in the final months of the civil war would eventually come out but "now was not the time for war crimes-type investigations". Mano Ganesan, leader of the Democratic People's Front, believed that "accountability was a divisive issue and the focus now had to be on uniting to rid the country of the Rajapaksas". For many local Tamil politicians accountability was not an immediate concern, they were instead focused on "bread-and-butter issues" such as IDP releases, Sinhala colonisation of traditional Tamil regions and re-developing the local economy.

The Boston Globe, later commented that "No foreign leader has fared worse in the cables released by WikiLeaks than Sri Lanka’s President Mahinda Rajapaksa", regarding Butenis' implication of President Rajapaksa in the alleged war crimes.

== Human rights ==
In a cable dated 22 January 2010 on the subject of progress on key issues, the US ambassador in Colombo Patricia Butenis stated that a government led by General Sarath Fonseka "would be interested in moving forward more quickly than the Rajapaksa government" on the post-civil war issues in Sri Lanka.

Butenis believed that there had been a "dramatic improvement in the treatment of IDPs" but noted that "Large numbers...have not yet returned to their places of origin". Disappearances had "experienced a steady and significant decline" since the end of the civil war. Use of child soldiers by the Tamil Makkal Viduthalai Pulikal, a government backed paramilitary group, had also declined.

On the issue of war crimes Butenis repeated the comments she had made on the on cable dated 15 January 2010, namely that "responsibility for many of the alleged [war] crimes rests with the country’s senior civilian and military leadership, including President Rajapaksa and his brothers and opposition candidate General Fonseka" and that "there are no examples of a sitting regime undertaking wholesale investigations of its own troops or senior officials for war crimes".

In a cable dated 11 June 2009 on the subject of Commonwealth engagement on international issues, the Deputy Chief of Mission at the US embassy in London Richard LeBaron detailed a discussion by the Political Officer with Amitav Banerji, the Commonwealth's Political Director. Banerji said the human rights situation in Sri Lanka had been raised “informally and off the record” by the UK government at a meeting of Commonwealth Ministerial Action Group, resulting in "a difficult conversation" with the Sri Lankan Foreign Minister. Banerji also confirmed that Sri Lanka's offer to host the Commonwealth Heads of Government Meeting had been turned down due to concerns about "lending international credibility to the [Sri Lankan] Government’s actions".

== Liberation Tigers of Tamil Eelam ==
In a diplomatic cable dated 12 June 2007, Blake points out the human-rights violations by the LTTE. The cable reports on a meeting that "PolOff" had with a "private organization that provides assistance to refugees" (name of organization is redacted in the copy of the cable leaked). The organization "described the LTTE's 'one person per family' forced conscription program". The organization "stated that the Tigers require at least one person between the ages of 18 and 35 per family to fight for the LTTE." The cable reports the organization "noted the average age of LTTE 'recruits' is 17 years old." The use of the Tamils Rehabilitation Organization (TRO) by the LTTE to extract money from INGOs was also discussed in the cables as such, the organization "told us the LTTE had ordered INGOs to provide all project funding through local NGOs, which are managed collectively by the Tamil Rehabilitation Organization (TRO). For example, [the organization] receives money in its bank account from its headquarters or from international donors, then deposits the money into a separate bank account operated by a local NGO. The local NGO's director is always a member of TRO, as are many other members of the local NGO staff. The TRO representative withdraws the money from the local NGO's account, provides a cut to the LTTE, and distributes the rest to accomplish the particular project".

The chief facilitator of the 2002 peace process, Norwegian minister Erik Solheim sees Velupillai Prabhakaran, the leader of the LTTE as "completely isolated and has no understanding of the South, much less the broader world". He speculated that Prabhakaran has not spoken to a Sinhalese in ten years. The LTTE theoretician, Anton Balasingham was "the heavyweight thinker" of the organization. Prabhakaran had once told Japanese ambassador Seiichiro Otsuka that his elder son Charles Anthony was studying martial arts.

== Paramilitary groups ==
In a cable dated 18 May 2007 the US embassy in Colombo alleged that the Sri Lankan government was colluding with paramilitary groups in criminal activities including extrajudicial killings, abductions, child trafficking, extortion and prostitution. The cable detailed eyewitness accounts of paramilitary activities.

According to Blake paramilitary groups such as the Tamil Makkal Viduthalai Pulikal and Eelam People's Democratic Party have helped the Sri Lankan government fight the Tamil Tigers, kidnap Tamil Tiger collaborators and "give the GSL (Government of Sri Lanka) a measure of deniability". The paramilitary groups also compete with the Tamil Tigers for public support and new recruits. The paramilitaries "keep critics of the GSL fearful and quiet". The Sri Lankan government hopes to turn Karuna and Douglas Devananda into "pro-GSL political leaders in the East and North", ensuring long term control over these areas even if devolution is granted.

The Sri Lankan government under President Chandrika Kumaratunga gave direct financial assistance to the paramilitary groups. Financial pressures had forced the government of President Rajapaksa to stop this assistance but it continues to turn "a blind eye to extortion and kidnapping for ransom" by the EPDP and TMVP. According to one eyewitness Defence Secretary Gothabaya Rajapaksa gave authority for the EPDP and TMVP to "collect" money from Tamil businessmen. The cable concluded that "this may account for the sharp rise in lawlessness, especially extortion and kidnapping".

One eyewitness stated that the Sri Lankan Military wanted to clamp down on the paramilitaries but had been prevented by Gothabaya Rajapaksa because they were doing the "work" the military could not. Another stated that MPs, Muslims as well as Tamil, were fearful that "the GSL will use Karuna [TMVP] to assassinate them". Others said that the assassination of Tamil MP Joseph Pararajasingham had been set up by Karuna/TMVP with the help of EPDP leader Douglas Devananda and that Karuna/TMVP cadres had assassinated Nadarajah Raviraj, another Tamil MP.

According to eyewitnesses the Sri Lankan government allows the TMVP/Karuna to "recruit children forcibly from within IDP camps in the East". The average age of a TMVP/Karuna recruit was 14. The TMVP/Karuna had resorted to criminal activities to raise funds. They had stolen food and supplies destined for the IDP camps and sold them on. The operated prostitution rings in the IDP camps to "take care of" GSL soldiers. Women were forced into prostitution by the TMVP/Karuna. This had forced some families to marry off their daughters at the age of 12 in order to reduce the risk of them being forced into prostitution.

The cable stated that despite being a registered political party, the EPDP continued to be "a feared paramilitary group". With the assistance of the Sri Lanka Army the EPDP was "able to conduct extortion, abductions, extrajudicial killings and other criminal acts without fear of consequences" according to eyewitnesses. The EPDP was involved in child trafficking rings, boys being taken to work camps and girls into prostitution rings in India and Malaysia. The EPDP, like the TMVP/Karuna, forced women into prostitution rings servicing Sri Lankan soldiers. The EPDP also ran illicit alcohol smuggling ring using child "mules".

The cable concluded that the preponderance of eyewitness accounts of paramilitary activities and the extent of corroboration pointed "to a pattern of GSL complicity with paramilitary groups on multiple levels". The cable states that "top leaders of its security establishment may be providing direction to these paramilitaries". The Sri Lankan government denies any links with paramilitary groups and claims it has made efforts to improve human rights. Blake however believes that these efforts are "aimed more at improving Sri Lanka’s image abroad and have yet to produce concrete improvements".

== 2002 Peace process ==
A dispatch of cables ranging from 2002 to 2006 discuss the details of 2002 Norway brokered peace process in Sri Lanka. Following is a few points that were not widely known before.

Anton Balasingham the chief political strategist and chief negotiator of the LTTE, in a meeting with Milinda Moragoda, a key minister of the 2001-04 UNP government, jokingly (and accurately) used the term "extortion" in referring to his organization's so-called "taxation" policies. The minister described Balasingham as "sincere, amiable, flexible", much easier to deal with, and less dogmatic than he would have earlier thought. On a separate occasion, he points out the LTTE's April 2003 decision to walk away from the peace process, was tactical "shock therapy".

== UK-Sri Lanka relations ==
In a cable dated 7 May 2009 the Acting Deputy Chief of Mission at the US embassy in London Mark Tokola detailed the United Kingdom government's views and actions on Sri Lanka. According to Tim Waite, the Sri Lanka team leader at the Foreign and Commonwealth Office, much of the UK government's interest in Sri Lanka had been due to the "very vocal" Tamil diaspora. Attention had been paid particularly because a general election was due and many Tamils lived in marginal Labour constituencies. UK Foreign Secretary David Miliband had told Waite "he was spending 60 percent of his time at the moment on Sri Lanka".

The UK's main concerns were the civilians caught in the conflict zone, humanitarian access and IDP needs. According to Waite Miliband had been "disappointed" that the Sri Lankan government did not allow Swedish Foreign Minister Carl Bildt to join Miliband and Bernard Kouchner when they visited Sri Lanka in April 2009. The British parliamentary delegation which visited Sri Lanka in May 2009 found the conditions in the IDP camps to be "not nearly as good as it should". Waite claimed India was "ambivalent" on the Sri Lanka issue and did not want "undertake any heavy lifting" because the issue was "too sensitive". According to Waite the UK government had decided to support the US government in wanting the International Monetary Fund Stand-By Arrangement (loan) with Sri Lanka to be delayed.
