= Ministry of Traditional Industries and Small Enterprise Development =

Government ministry of Sri Lanka

Ministry overview
- Formed: 2010
- Dissolved: 2015
- Jurisdiction: Democratic Socialist Republic of Sri Lanka
- Employees: 145
- Annual budget: LKR 1.09 billion
- Child agencies: Industrial Development Board; National Craft Council; Palmyrah Development Board; National Design Centre; North Sea Limited

The Ministry of Traditional Industries and Small Enterprise Development was a Sri Lankan government ministry responsible for oversight of policy guidance and facilitation for traditional local industry, SMEs and the handicraft industry, with a goal of helping improve these industries to compete on the international market. It thus targeted home-based enterprises and cited poverty reduction, rural development and inclusive growth and social development as secondary focuses. The ministry was part of the Rajapaksa cabinet.

== List of ministers ==
Minister of Traditional Industries and Small Enterprise Development
- Appointer: Mahinda Rajapaksa
- Formation: 23 April 2010
- Final holder: Douglas Devananda
- Abolished: 9 January 2015

Parties

Sri Lanka Freedom Party United National Party Eelam People's Democratic Party

Name	Portrait	Party	Tenure	President
Douglas Devananda	Douglas Devananda	Eelam People's Democratic Party	23 April 2010 – Present	Mahinda Rajapaksa

== See also ==
- List of ministries of Sri Lanka
- Economy of Sri Lanka
- Poverty in Sri Lanka
