= Ministry of Productivity Promotion =

Government ministry of Sri Lanka

Ministry overview
- Formed: 22 November 2010
- Dissolved: 8 January 2015
- Superseding Ministry: National Productivity Secretariat
- Jurisdiction: Democratic Socialist Republic of Sri Lanka
- Headquarters: 49 Stanley Thilakaratne mawatha, Nugegoda
- Child agencies: Department of Manpower and Employment; National Productivity Secretariat

The Ministry of Productivity Promotion was a former cabinet ministry of the Government of Sri Lanka responsible for oversight of the country's labour market through policy formulation and implementation for skills development of the national workforce, with a targeted national productivity growth of 5-6% annually.

== List of ministers ==
Minister of Productivity Promotion of Sri Lanka
- Appointer: President of Sri Lanka
- Formation: 22 November 2010
- First holder: Lakshman Senewiratne
- Final holder: Basheer Segu Dawood
- Abolished: 8 January 2015

Parties

Sri Lanka Freedom Party United National Party Sri Lanka Muslim Congress

Name	Portrait	Party	Tenure	President
Lakshman Senewiratne		Sri Lanka Freedom Party	22 November 2010 - 27 January 2013	Mahinda Rajapaksa
Basheer Segu Dawood		Sri Lanka Muslim Congress	28 January 2013 - 9 January 2015	Mahinda Rajapaksa

== See also ==
- List of ministries of Sri Lanka
