= Suicide bomb attack on Devananda's Ministry =

2007 attempted assassination in Sri Lanka

Attempted assassination of Douglas Devananda
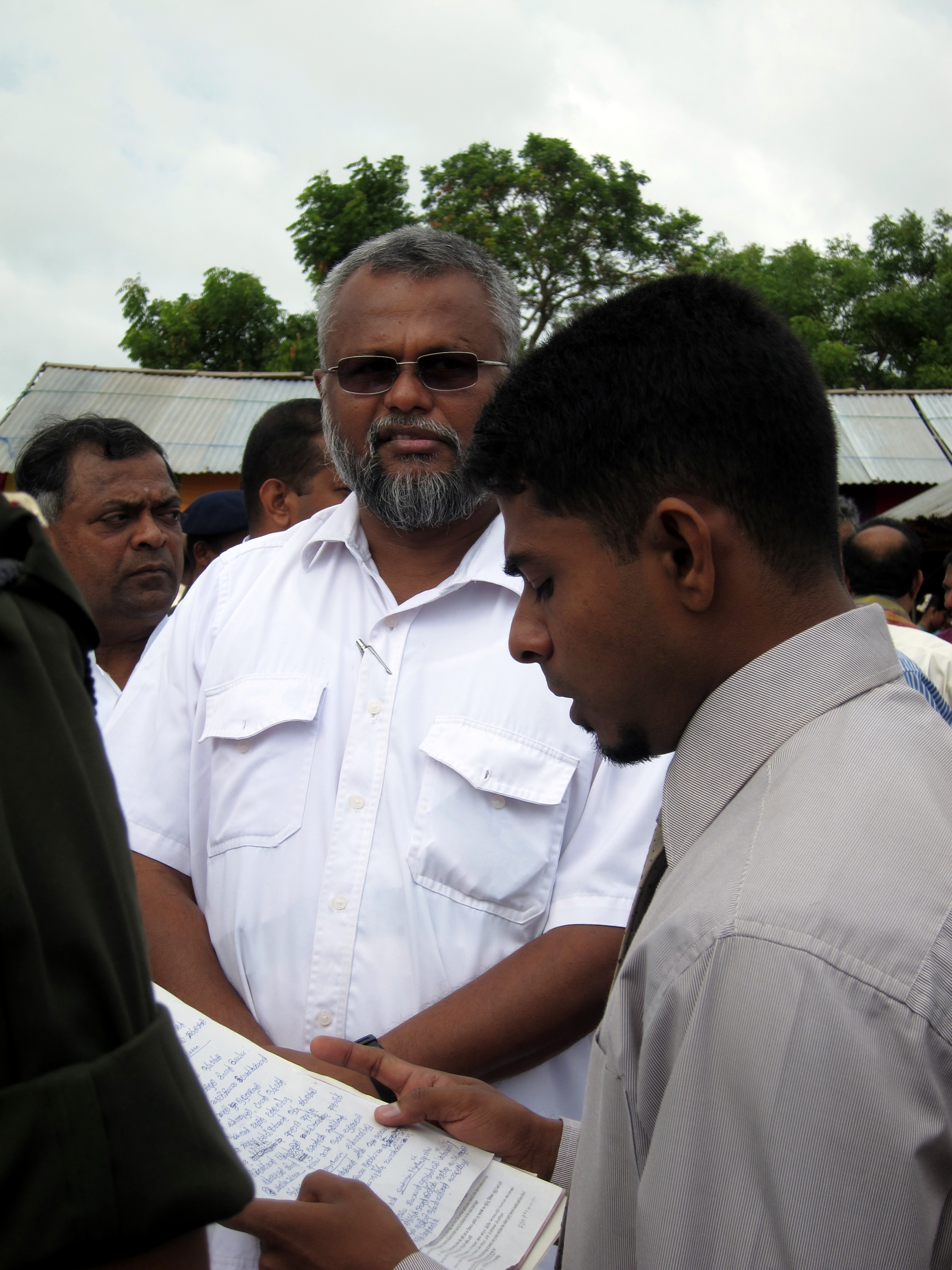
- Date: November 28, 2007
- Time: 08:07:05 (SLST)
- Location: Isipathana Mawatha, Narahenpita, Colombo
- Motive: terrorism
- Target: Douglas Devananda
- Perpetrator: Sujatha Vagawanam
- Deaths: 1
- Injuries: 2-3

On 28 November 2007, a female suicide bomber attempted to assassinate Douglas Devananda, a prominent Sri Lankan Tamil politician and leader of the Eelam People’s Democratic Party (EPDP), at his office in Narahenpita, Colombo. Devananda survived the attempt, though two people were killed and several others injured. The attack was widely believed to have been carried out by the Liberation Tigers of Tamil Eelam (LTTE).

== Attack and attempt ==
The bombing occurred during Devananda’s weekly public day, where constituents could meet him at his Colombo office. Around 07:36, a young woman in a yellow blouse and white sari with golden borders, reportedly disabled with a limp. At 07: 46, she calmly waits in a queue of those seeking an audience with the minister, conversing with a receptionist through a counter window amid a group of people. At 08:04, she then walked to the waiting area and offered up a few documents to the minister's aide before sitting down on a red velveteen chair at his desk.

The woman sat down in front of a desk and answered questions from Devananda's 72-year-old aide Steven Peiris. After nearly a minute and a half, he began gesturing for her to sit down in a nearby cluster of white plastic chairs, apparently to await a security check. At 8:07, she then stood up facing Peiris, reached her right hand to her right shoulder and detonated the explosive. She flew backwards, her head separating from her body, ricocheting from the ceiling before the room filled with smoke. The blast killed one of Peiris and injured others, but Devananda himself, who was 25–30 feet away, escaped unscathed.

== Victims ==
The explosion killed Steven Peiris, Devananda’s personal secretary, instantly. Several others—including security personnel—were injured to varying degrees.

== Security lapses ==
Following the incident, the Sri Lankan ministry of defence released a video titled: “Sri Lankan Homicide/Suicide Bomber Attack terrorist”, which showed CCTV video of the incident. Video surveillance showed the bomber entering without urgency or fear. Investigations revealed that the explosives were concealed on her body, likely in a bra‑style undergarment. Though no group claimed responsibility, authorities blamed the LTTE Black Tigers. Security gaps were noted: she had no appointment, lacked an introducer letter from her hometown in Vavuniya, and reportedly had a limp—though Devananda later stated the polio-related disability claim was incorrect.

== Perpetrator ==
Sujatha Vagawanam
- சுஜாதா வாகவனம்
- Born: January 1, 1983; Puliyankulam, Vavuniya
- Died: November 28, 2007 (aged 24); Narahenpita, Colombo
- Other name: Megamanan sujendra
- Organization: LTTE

Following the attack, on November 30, the Sri Lankan Ministry of Defence released a black-and-white portrait of the suspect, taken from the National Identity Card submitted with her documents. The authorities appealed to the public for assistance in identifying the woman, who was identified as Sujatha Vagawanam alias Megamanan Sujendra, born on 1 January 1983, a resident of Puliyankulam, Vavuniya. Though little is known about the subsequent investigation. As with many members of the Black Tigers, it is believed that she may have been recruited following a personal injury, hence explaining her limp. Another thing that would have been noted is that since her national identity card stated she was from Vavuniya, which was a disputed territory at the time between the Sri Lankan Army and the LTTE, It would have brought forward security concerns.
