= Lessons Learnt and Reconciliation Commission =

Sri Lankan commission of inquiry

The Lessons Learnt and Reconciliation Commission (LLRC, Sinhala: උගත් පාඩම් හා ප්‍රතිසන්ධාන කොමිෂන් සභාව Ugath Padam Ha Prathisandhana Komishan Sabhava, Tamil: கற்றுக்கொண்ட பாடங்கள் மற்றும் நல்லிணக்க ஆணைக்குழு) was a commission of inquiry appointed by Sri Lankan President Mahinda Rajapaksa in May 2010 after the 26-year-long civil war in Sri Lanka to function as a Truth and reconciliation commission. The commission was mandated to investigate the facts and circumstances which led to the failure of the ceasefire agreement made operational on 27 February 2002, the lessons that should be learnt from those events and the institutional, administrative and legislative measures which need to be taken in order to prevent any recurrence of such concerns in the future, and to promote further national unity and reconciliation among all communities. After an 18-month inquiry, the commission submitted its report to the President on 15 November 2011. The report was made public on 16 December 2011, after being tabled in the parliament.

The commission concluded that the Sri Lankan military didn't deliberately target civilians but the rebel Liberation Tigers of Tamil Eelam (LTTE) repeatedly violated international humanitarian law. According to the commission the military gave the "highest priority" to protecting civilians whereas the Tamil Tigers had had "no respect for human life". The commission admitted that civilians had been killed by the Sri Lankan military, albeit accidentally, contradicting the government's line that there were zero civilian casualties. The commission did, however, receive some eyewitness evidence alleging abuse by the military which warranted further investigation and, if necessary, the prosecution of perpetrators. The commission acknowledged that hospitals had been shelled, resulting "considerable civilian casualties", but it did not say who was responsible for the shelling. The commission blamed Sinhalese and Tamil politicians for causing the civil war: the Sinhalese politicians failed to offer a solution acceptable to the Tamil people, and the Tamil politicians fanned militant separatism.

The commission has been heavily criticised by international human rights groups, the UN Panel of Experts and others due its limited mandate, alleged lack of independence and its failure to meet minimum international standards or offer protection to witnesses. These critics believed that the Sri Lankan government was using the commission as a tool to prevent an independent international investigation of alleged abuses. As a consequence of this, Amnesty International, Human Rights Watch and the International Crisis Group refused to appear before the commission.

== Background ==
Tensions between the Sinhalese and Tamil communities in Sri Lanka turned into a full-scale war between the Sri Lankan government and LTTE in 1983. In 2002, government and the LTTE signed a Norwegian-mediated ceasefire. Both LTTE and the government resumed fighting in 2006, and the government officially backed out of the ceasefire in 2008. After a violent last few months, in May 2009, the government killed LTTE leader Velupillai Prabhakaran and declared an end to the civil war. Following the end of the war, international pressure mounted on the government to inquire into the final stages of the civil war, in which it was alleged thousands of civilians, possibly as many as 40,000, were killed. Over the course of the entire war, between 60,000 and 100,000 deaths. There were calls to look into the root causes of the civil war and meaningful reconciliation. The Sri Lankan government rejected calls for an independent international inquiry but instead on 15 May 2010, nearly a year after the end of the civil war, President Rajapaksa appointed the Lessons Learnt and Reconciliation Commission to look back at the conflict Sri Lanka suffered for 26 years. Its secretariat was established at the Lakshman Kadirgamar Institute of International Relations and Strategic Studies in Colombo. Hearings of the commission, which commenced on 11 August 2010, were public and open to media, unless the witness requested otherwise. The LLRC issued some interim recommendations on 13 September 2010. Time limit to produce the final report was extended twice, until 15 November 2011. Hearings were held in Colombo and in former conflict affected areas such as Batticaloa, Jaffna, Kilinochchi, Mannar and Vavuniya. Field visits were conducted to the former war zone and detention centres where surrendered Tamil Tiger combatants were held. After analysing over 1,000 oral and 5,000 written submissions it had received, the commission presented its 388-page final report to the President on 15 November 2011. It was made public on 16 December 2011.

== Mandate ==
The mandate of the LLRC was as follows:

"To inquire and report on the following matters that may have taken place during the period between 21 February 2002 and 19 May 2009, namely:

- The facts and circumstances which led to the failure of the ceasefire agreement operationalized on 21 February 2002 and the sequence of events that followed thereafter up to the 19th of May, 2009.
- Whether any person, group or institution directly or indirectly bear responsibility in this regard;
- The lessons we would learn from those events and their attendant concern, in order to ensure that there will be no recurrence;
- The methodology whereby restitution to any person affected by those events or their dependants or their heirs, can be affected;
- The institutional administrative and legislative measured which need to be taken in order or prevent any recurrence of such concerns in the future, and to promote further national unity and the reconciliation among all communities, and to make any such other recommendations with reference to any of the matters that have been inquired into under the terms of the Warrant."

== Members ==
The LLRC's eight members were:

1. C. R. De Silva, PC (chair) - Attorney General (2007–09); Solicitor General (1999–2007); Deputy Solicitor General (1992–97)
2. A. Rohan Perera, PC - former legal advisor to the Ministry of Foreign Affairs and current member of the International Law Commission
3. Karunaratne Hangawatte - Professor of Criminal Justice at the Department of Criminal Justice, University of Nevada, Las Vegas and former consultant to the United Nations
4. Chandirapal Chanmugam - Secretary to the Treasury (1987–88)
5. H. M. G. S. Palihakkara - former Secretary, Ministry of Foreign Affairs and former Permanent Representative to the United Nations
6. Manohari Ramanathan - former Deputy Legal Draftsman and former member of the Monetary Board of Sri Lanka
7. Maxwell Parakrama Paranagama - former High Court Judge
8. M. T. M. Bafiq - Senior Attorney at law and member of the Human Rights Commission of Sri Lanka

The commission's secretary was S. B. Atugoda, a former Sri Lankan ambassador to Qatar.

== Interim recommendations ==
In September 2010 the LLRC published its interim recommendations:

- A special mechanism should be created to examine the cases of long term detainees on a case-by-case basis;
- A list of names of those in detention be published;
- Released detainees should be issued with a certificate of discharge so that they are not taken into custody again;
- Delays in the legal system should be looked into;
- The government should issue a clear policy statement that private land will not be used for government backed settlements;
- Illegal armed groups be disarmed (high priority);
- Immediate steps be taken so that the public can communicate with officials and receive documents in a language that they understand;
- Free movement on the A9 highway should be encouraged; and
- There should be better coordination and communication between government agents and the security forces in normalising civil administration.

== The report ==
=== Summary ===
The report provides a detailed analysis of the oral and written representations made to the commission. The 1st chapter gives an introduction to the report and the methodology the commission has used. 2nd chapter is devoted to the 2002 Ceasefire Agreement (CFA). There the commission analyses its background, political and security dimensions and the impact. The commission also tries to evaluate the CFA's effectiveness and the causes which led to its eventual collapse. The next chapter provides an insight into the security forces operations in Eastern and Wanni theatres, with a note about the casualty figures of both security forces and the Liberation Tigers of Tamil Eelam (LTTE). Chapter 4 deals with the Humanitarian law issues pertaining to the conflict. This includes hundreds of eyewitness reports and clarifications of the incidents brought to light. There is also an evaluation of the Sri Lanka experience in the context of allegations of violations of International humanitarian law (IHL). Here, the commission concludes that security forces had not deliberately targeted civilians during the final stages of war, but civilian casualties had occurred under unavoidable circumstances. The commission also casts doubts about the authenticity of Channel 4 videos.

Chapter 5 deals with the human rights issues arising from the conflict. It analyses the alleged "white van" abductions, unlawful arrests, arbitrary detention and involuntary disappearances. This chapter goes into details of the instances where such incidents have occurred, and places the blame on certain paramilitary groups who allegedly hold the responsibility. Next 2 chapters are devoted to land issues regarding the returning Internally Displaced Persons (IDPs) and restitution/compensatory relief paid out to persons who are affected by the conflict. Chapter 8 talks about the post war reconciliation and alleviating the grievances of affected groups, especially the Sri Lankan Tamil people, in broad terms. The ninth and the final chapter summarizes the principle observations and recommendations made by the commission.

=== Observations ===
"What needs to be done for reconciliation and nation-building is that the State has to reach out to the minorities and the minorities, in turn must, re-position themselves in their role vis a vis the State and the country. There must be willingness on the part of all political parties to give up adversarial politics and have consensual decision-making on national issues. In order to meet the challenges of this opportunity there has to be courage and political will on the part of all political parties."

— Report by Lessons Learnt and Reconciliation Commission (p. 368)
- The 2002 ceasefire agreement (CFA) which was signed between the Sri Lankan government and LTTE, although brought about a short lived respite to the country, was unstable and eventually unproductive.
- Conceptual flaws and the untenable dual roles of the Government of Norway, as facilitator of the peace process and the head of the Sri Lanka Monitoring Mission paved the way to its failure.
- The military strategy of the Sri Lanka Armed Forces during Eelam War IV is satisfactory. It gave the highest priority to the protection of civilian population.
- Security Forces had not deliberately targeted civilians in the No Fire Zones (NFZs), which were declared in the final stages of the war.
- Given the complexity of the situation and based on the Principle of Proportionality, commission concluded that the Security Forces were confronted with an unprecedented situation where no other choice was possible other than returning fire into the NFZs in reply to the incoming fire, and all "feasible precautions" that were practicable in the circumstances had been taken. Determining and obtaining of a re-construction of all the conditions under which the "combat action" took place would be "next to impossible".
- The commission is satisfied, on a careful consideration of all the circumstances that shells had in fact fallen on hospitals causing damage and resulting in civilian casualties. But evidence submitted is equivocal in nature and does not warrant a definitive conclusion that one party or the other was responsible for the shelling.
- Government of Sri Lanka with the co-operation of the aid agencies, has taken all possible steps in getting food, medical supplies and other essential items across to the entrapped civilians. However, there appears to have been a paucity of medicines and the medical facilities appear to have been inadequate.
- LTTE was engaged in grave violations of core principles of International humanitarian law (IHL) by using civilians as human shields, placing and using military equipment in civilian centres, shooting at civilians trying to escape into safe areas, conscripting young children to engage in combat etc.
- Absence of a proper verification process during the final stages of the war has contributed to the unverified sweeping generalizations of a highly speculative nature, as regards casualty figures.
- There are a number of shortcomings in the existing IHL regime pertaining to internal conflicts involving states and non state armed groups.
- Technical ambiguities, electronic tampering and the artificial construction of the 'blood effect' in the 3 separate videos (originally in 3GP format) that appears in Channel 4 documentary Sri Lanka's Killing Fields, cast significant doubts on their authenticity, leading to questions on whether the incidents are 'real' or 'staged'.
- There was an alarmingly large number of representations made in front of the commission alleging abductions, unlawful arrests, arbitrary detention and involuntary disappearances, regarding which no official action has been taken.
- Programmes in rehabilitation centers for ex-LTTE combatants are conducted in a professional and caring manner.
- The grievances of the Tamil community has been a root cause for the ethnic conflict.
- Along with an independent judiciary and a transparent legal process, strict adherence to the rule of law is a sine qua non for peace and stability of the country.
- An independent and permanent Police Commission is a pre-requisite to guarantee the effective functioning of the Police service.
- While the distribution of meaningful powers to the periphery is essential, there are powers which form the core responsibilities of the state and which cannot be so devolved, and need to be retained and exercised by the government at the centre.

=== Recommendations ===
"The process of reconciliation requires a full acknowledgement of the tragedy of the conflict and a collective act of contrition by the political leaders and civil society, of both Sinhala and Tamil communities. The conflict could have been avoided had the southern political leaders of the two main political parties acted in the national interest and forged a consensus between them to offer an acceptable solution to the Tamil people. The Tamil political leaders were equally responsible for this conflict which could have been avoided had the Tamil leaders refrained from promoting an armed campaign towards secession, acquiescing in the violence and terrorist methods used by the LTTE against both the Sinhala and Tamil people, and failing to come out strongly and fearlessly against the LTTE, and their atrocious practices."

— Report by Lessons Learnt and Reconciliation Commission (p. 387)
- Further investigations should be carried out regarding four particular incidents which caused death or injury to civilians, on possible implication of the security forces.
- Necessary investigations should be carried out into specific allegations of disappearances after surrender/arrest, and where such investigations produce evidence of any unlawful act on the part of individual members of the Army, the wrongdoers should be prosecuted and punished.
- Take due account on surrendered LTTE cadres against whom investigations reveal prima facie material for prosecution.
- IHL regime should take into account the grey areas in the existing legal framework applicable to internal conflicts involving states and non state armed groups.
- A professionally designed household survey should be conducted covering all affected families in all parts of the island to ascertain firsthand the scale and the circumstances of death and injury to civilians, as well as damage to property during the period of the conflict.
- Institute an independent investigation into Channel 4 videos.
- A special commissioner should be appointed to investigate alleged disappearances and provide material to the Attorney general to initiate criminal proceedings as appropriate.
- Death certificates should be issued and monetary recompense should be provided where necessary. Steps should be taken to effectively implement the amendment to the Registration of Deaths Act (2006).
- Appoint an independent advisory committee to monitor and examine detention and arrest of persons under any regulations made under the Public Security Ordinance or the Prevention of Terrorism Act (PTA).
- Domestic legislation should be framed to specifically criminalize enforced or involuntary disappearances.
- Prepare a centralized and comprehensive database containing a list of detainees and make that available to their next of kin.
- All illegal armed groups should be disarmed.
- Grant the legal ownership of land to those who have been resettled.
- In instances where there is prima facie evidence of conscription of children as combatants (by both LTTE and TMVP), any such alleged cases should be investigated and offenders must be brought to justice.
- Increased employment opportunities should be provided to those in the former conflict affected areas.
- An inter-agency task force mandated to addressing the needs of vulnerable groups like women, children, elderly and disabled, must be established.
- Investigate and inquire into alleged incidents of serious violations of human rights including the 2006 Trincomalee massacre and the 2006 massacre of 17 aid workers.
- The land policy of the governments should not be an instrument to effect unnatural changes in the demographic pattern of a given province.
- A National Land Commission (NLC) should be established in order to propose appropriate future national land policy guidelines.
- All political parties should arrive at a bipartisan understanding on national land policy and recognize it as a national issue. Land policy should not be used as a tool to gain narrow political advantage.
- The role and capacity of the Rehabilitation of Persons, Properties and Industries Authority (REPPIA) should be reviewed, giving its primary focus in providing compensatory relief for persons affected by the conflict. Ex-LTTE combatants and next of kin should also be considered eligible for compensatory relief.
- Involvement of the security forces in civilian activities in North Eastern Province should be phased out. Private lands should be used giving reasonable time lines.
- A proper investigation should be carried out on the alleged involvement of Vinayagamoorthy Muralitharan alias Karuna Amman and Sivanesathurai Chandrakanthan alias Pillayan in the 1990 massacre of Sri Lankan Police officers.
- A full investigation should be done on the alleged acts of extortion committed by members of the Eelam People's Democratic Party (EPDP).
- Steps should be taken to neutralise the activities of a gang led by a person called Major Seelan in connection with offences of abduction, extortion and robbery using the security forces facilities as a cover.
- Units of the Attorney General's department should be set up in the provinces to guide and advise the Police regarding criminal investigations, prosecutions and other matters touching upon the criminal justice system.
- An independent Public Service Commission should be established without delay to ensure that there is no political interference in the public service.
- A good-faith effort should be taken to develop a consensus on power devolution, building on what exists – both, for maximum possible devolution to the periphery, as well as power sharing at the centre.
- Learning of each other's languages should be made a compulsory part of the school curriculum.
- All Government offices should have Tamil-speaking officers at all times. Police Stations should have bi-lingual officers on a 24-hour basis.
- A proactive policy should be implemented to encourage mixed schools serving children from different ethnic and religious backgrounds.
- Government should engage with the so-called 'hostile diaspora groups' constructively and address their concerns.
- National anthem should be sung simultaneously in two languages to the same tune.
- Laws should be strictly enforced on the instances of hate speech that contributes to communal disharmony.
- A separate event should be set apart on the National Day (4 February) to express solidarity and empathy with all victims of the tragic conflict and pledge the collective commitment to ensure that there should never be such blood-letting in the country again.

=== Figures ===
- Casualty figure of Sri Lanka armed forces during the Eelam War IV, from 26 July 2006 (operation to recapture of the Mavil Aru reservoir), to 18 May 2009 (formal declaration of the cessation of hostilities), stands at 5,556 killed, 28,414 wounded and 169 missing in action.
- During the same period, LTTE had lost 22,247 cadres of which 11,812 had been identified by name. Among the combatants identified by name, 4,264 belonged to the period from January 2009 to May 2009.
- Civilian officials who made representations to the commission indicated that they were not in a position, under the circumstances of conflict, to carry out any assessment of civilian casualties. Consequently, no estimated or verified figures of civilian casualties are available in the report.
- Records of the Ministry of Health indicates that from January to June 2009, government hospitals in the Northern Province have recorded 1,353 deaths after admission. Further 106 deaths of patients happened after being transferred to hospitals outside the conflict area. Vavuniya Base Hospital has registered a total of 870 deaths during the same period. Of these, 257 deaths have been registered as due to firearm and blast injuries.
- Report points out 474 instances of involuntary disappearances since 2006.

== Implementation ==
In October 2010 the government established the Inter-Agency Advisory Committee headed by the then attorney general Mohan Peiris to implement the LLRC's interim recommendations. However, the recommendations remain largely unimplemented. The LLRC's final report admits that there had been no progress in the implementation of its interim recommendations.

On March 13, 2012, the Sri Lankan government released a statement on the formulation of an action plan to implement the recommendations of LLRC.

According to a study by the Colombo-based think tank Verité Research, only 20 percent of the commission's 189 actionable recommendations have been implemented, with 57% of the cases being described as "partial implementation" and 22% of the cases being described as "poor" in progress.

== Criticism of commission ==
The LLRC has been criticized by international human rights groups, the UN Panel of Experts and others due its limited mandate, alleged lack of independence and its failure to meet minimum international standards or offer protection to witnesses. These critics argued that the commission was primarily set up to examine the failure of the 2002 ceasefire and had no explicit mandate to examine the alleged war crimes committed by both sides during the final months of the civil war. But the Sri Lankan government rejected the UN's war report calling it "fundamentally flawed" and "patently biased". According to criticism, previous commissions of inquiry established by the Sri Lankan government had failed to achieve anything other than delaying criminal investigations and had been plagued by government interference.

Amnesty International has condemned the commission as "fundamentally flawed" and unable to provide accountability for alleged atrocities. Amnesty claimed that the LLRC was a ploy by the Sri Lankan government to prevent an independent international investigation and that it would never deliver justice, truth and full reparations for the war victims. Human Rights Watch (HRW) claimed that the commission was an inadequate response to the many serious allegations of wartime abuses; explaining that it lacked independence and a proper mandate; its members weren't impartial or competent; it failed to provide adequate and effective protection for witnesses; it didn't have adequate resources; and that the government wouldn't give serious consideration to the commission's recommendations. The International Crisis Group (ICG) claimed that the flawed LLRC would neither provide accountability nor reconciliation. As a consequence of the above concerns Amnesty, HRW and ICG announced in October 2010 that they had declined to appear before the "fundamentally flawed" commission.

The independence of the commission has been questioned due to the fact its members were appointed by the Sri Lankan government, one of the parties accused of committing war crimes. Most of its members were retired senior government employees. Some even held senior government positions during the final stages of the war when they publicly defended the conduct of the government and military against allegations of war crimes. H. M. G. S. Palihakkara, who was Sri Lanka's Permanent Representative to the United Nations in Geneva, represented the government and defended the actions of the Sri Lankan military during the final months of the civil war. A. Rohan Perera was legal advisor to the Foreign Ministry during the period investigated by the LLRC. The chair C. R. De Silva was Attorney-General from April 2007 to December 2008 and as such was the most senior law officer with responsibility for many of the issues brought before the LLRC. Silva was accused of interfering in a previous commission, the 2006-2009 Presidential Commission of Inquiry into allegations of serious human rights violations by the security forces. The International Independent Group of Eminent Persons, who had been invited by the President to oversee the commission's work, resigned in April 2008 citing De Silva's behaviour as one of major reasons for doing so.

The commission was seen as a tool to discredit the opposition United National Party whose leader Ranil Wickramasinghe was Prime Minister when the ceasefire agreement with the LTTE was signed in 2002. The BBC was banned from covering the proceeding.

== Reaction to report ==
=== Sri Lanka ===
The report was generally received well within Sri Lanka, although some aspects of the report were criticized by various political groups and figures.

The Tamil National Alliance (TNA), the largest political party representing the Sri Lankan Tamils, criticised the report for categorically failing to "effectively and meaningfully deal with issues of accountability" and called its findings an offence against the dignity of the war victims. The TNA has called on the international community to establish a "mechanism for accountability" in order to bring to book the perpetrators of war crimes. In an interview with The Sunday Leader TNA leader R. Sampanthan expressed his disappointment of the report stating: "on the particular issue of accountability with regard to violation of international humanitarian laws and international human rights laws by the Sri Lankan Government." He also said that the report has not done justice for the many thousands of victims of the war. According to TNA MP M. A. Sumanthiran the LLRC had contradicted itself by maintaining that it had no mandate to investigate into any incident and yet clearing of the armed forces of deliberately targeting civilians. “How can the LLRC come to such a conclusion without investigating into the matter”, Sumanthiran queried. The TNA subsequently issued a 115-page analytical response to the LLRC report in which it concluded that the LLRC had "failed to fulfill the expectations of the Tamil community" and that it did "not address important questions of accountability; was designed to shield civilian and military leaders responsible for serious crimes from blame; and evinces the Sri Lankan State’s unwillingness to acknowledge and address issues of accountability". The report went on to urge the international community to acknowledge that the domestic accountability mechanisms had consistently failed and to "take steps to establish an international mechanism for accountability".

Jathika Hela Urumaya, a Sinhalise national group, claimed that LLRC had over passed their mandate and had failed to look into the 9,878 civil assassinations carried out by the LTTE.

Dr. Dayan Jayatilleka, former Sri Lankan ambassador to France, commenting on the report stated "Though not without flaws and lacuna, LLRC report does not disappoint, and reaches high standards, ranking with the best reports emanating over the decades from official and semi-official/autonomous Sri Lankan commissions, reviews and probes. It is a serious, thoughtful, carefully written and constructed text, striking in its fair-mindedness and balance. It deserves constructive engagement with, by all concerned Sri Lankan citizens and those in the world community who are concerned about and with Sri Lanka." He pointed out two factual inaccuracies in the report. The first one being that the 2002 CFA was the result and in the context of the military weakness of the Sri Lankan state. He explained, this had in fact not been the case as at that time, LRRP missions were taking down the Tiger command structure and followed and not preceded the disastrous Agni Kheela operation and the devastating Bandaranaike Airport attack. Second one is that LLRC Report draws a veil of silence over the lopsided post-tsunami relief mechanism (PTOMS) which was negotiated at the tail end of the presidency of Chandrika Kumaratunga.

Editorial of "The Island" — the Sri Lankan English language daily — named "LLRC shows the way" (19 December 2011) compared the LLRC report with the Report of the Secretary-General's Panel of Experts on Accountability in Sri Lanka saying, "Unlike the UN Secretary General's advisory panel which took cover behind a wall of secrecy and hurriedly put together a report of sorts--which has been made out to be a UN document--based on mere unsubstantiated allegations and LTTE propaganda, the LLRC has ensured transparency in the process of inquiry and presented both sides of the story complete with its observations and recommendations."

Editorial of "The Sunday Times" — the Sri Lankan English language daily — named "Heed LLRC's call to save Rule of Law" noted that while "the commission was not something the Government had in mind in the flush of its military victory over the Liberation Tigers of Tamil Eelam (LTTE) in May 2009", it "quite correctly placed much of the blame for this polarization on politicians who were looking to bolster their vote base by whipping up the communal drum". It also stated that "This LLRC report is not to be taken lightly due to both international and domestic pressure for good governance. This report is in a completely different league."

=== International ===
Australia - Australian Foreign Minister Kevin Rudd issued a statement on 13 February 2012 welcoming the report's recommendations but expressing concern that it failed "to fully address alleged violations of international humanitarian and human rights law". The statement noted that Australia had consistently called on Sri Lanka to "investigate all allegations of crimes committed by both sides to the conflict, including those raised in the UN Secretary-General's Panel of Experts report" but that the LLRC report had failed to "comprehensively address such allegations". As such the Australian government continues to call on Sri Lanka to investigate all such allegations "in a transparent and independent manner". The statement urged the Sri Lankan government to "set clear, firm timeframes" for the implementation of the report's recommendations.

Canada - Canadian Foreign Minister John Baird issued a statement on 11 January 2012 strongly urging the Sri Lankan government to implement the report's recommendations but expressing concern "that the report does not fully address the grave accusations of serious human rights violations that occurred toward the end of the conflict. Many of the allegations outlined by the UN Secretary-General’s Panel of Experts on Accountability in Sri Lanka have not been adequately addressed by this report". The statement noted that so far the Sri Lankan government had made no meaningful attempt at reconciliation or accountability. The statement reiterated the Canadian Government's call for "an independent investigation into the credible and serious allegations raised by the UN Secretary-General’s Panel".

The Commonwealth Secretary-General Kamalesh Sharma issued a statement on 19 December 2011 welcoming the release of the report and the commitments given by the Sri Lankan government in respect the conclusions and recommendations.

European Union - The High Representative of the Union for Foreign Affairs and Security Policy Catherine Ashton issued a statement on 16 December 2011 on behalf of the European Union noting the presentation of the LLRC report to the Sri Lankan Parliament and expressing hope "that the report will contribute to the process of reconciliation in Sri Lanka. A detailed and careful study of the measures proposed to implement the recommendations in the report is needed, including on the issue of accountability. We continue to encourage the Government of Sri Lanka to engage with the UN Secretary General and relevant UN bodies on these matters.

In February 2012 some Member of the European Parliament tried unsuccessfully to pass a resolution which welcomed the LLRC report and urged its rapid implementation. Instead the European Parliament passed resolution P7 TA-PROV(2012)0058 B7-0071/2012 in which it called for the "establishment of a UN commission of inquiry into all crimes committed, as recommended by the UN Secretary General's Panel of Experts on Sri Lanka".

India - While welcoming the public release of the LLRC report, an official spokesperson of India's External Affairs Ministry expressed hope that Sri Lanka would act decisively and with vision on devolution of powers and genuine national reconciliation. The spokesperson concluded that "It is important to ensure that an independent and credible mechanism is put in place to investigate allegations of human rights violations, as brought out the LLRC, in a time-bound manner".

South Africa - The Department of International Relations and Cooperation issued as statement on 30 January 2012 noting the release of the final report and its positive recommendations. However, the statement noted that the report failed to address in detail "the question of holding those people responsible for human rights violations to account". The South African government urged the Sri Lankan government to implement the reports recommendations "speedily".

United Kingdom - Foreign Office Minister Alistair Burt issued a statement to the House of Commons on 12 January 2012 welcoming the publication of the report but expressing disappointment at the report's findings and recommendations on accountability. The statement went on to say "Like many others, we feel that these leave many gaps and unanswered questions...we note that many credible allegations of violations of international humanitarian law and human rights law, including from the UN Panel of Experts report, are either not addressed or only partially answered". The British Government would, according to the statement, work with international partners, including relevant international organisations, to achieve lasting peace and reconciliation in Sri Lanka.

United Nations - UN Secretary-General Ban Ki-moon welcomed the public release of LLRC report and hoped "that the Sri Lankan Government will move forward on its commitments to deal with accountability...in good faith as an essential step towards reconciliation and lasting peace in the island country".

At the 19th session of the United Nations Human Rights Council Navi Pillay, UN High Commissioner for Human Rights, welcomed the report's publications and noted that it makes important recommendations. However, Pillay believed that the report fell "short of the comprehensive accountability process recommended by the Secretary-General’s Panel of Experts" and she went on the urge the UNHRC to discuss the report.

United States - Commenting on the report, deputy spokesperson of the United States Department of State Victoria Nuland expressed concern that it "does not fully address all the allegations of serious human rights violations that occurred in the final phase of the conflict". She therefore urged the Sri Lankan government not only to fulfil all of the LLRC's recommendations but also to address the accountability issues that the report did not cover. On the issue of an independent, international probe into the final phase of the war, Nuland stated that the position of the USA remains that "it is better for Sri Lankans to take these issues themselves and address them fully...let’s see what they are willing to do going forward".

=== Human rights groups ===
Following the release of the report, Amnesty International noted that the LLRC report "acknowledges serious human rights problems in Sri Lanka but falls short of fully addressing the war crimes and crimes against humanity committed during the final phases of the conflict". According to Amnesty the report ignores the "serious evidence of war crimes, crimes against humanity and other violations of the laws of war by government forces". Amnesty urged the Sri Lankan authorities to take the report's recommendations seriously but concluded that, based on previous experience, "effective investigation and prosecution of all wrongdoers...is very unlikely without the active support of the international community".

Human Rights Watch has condemned the LLRC report for disregarding the worst abuses by government forces, rehashing long-standing recommendations and failing to advance accountability for victims of Sri Lanka's civil armed conflict. HRW has stated that the "serious shortcomings" of the report highlighted "the need for an international investigative mechanism into the conflict as recommended by the United Nations Secretary-General’s Panel of Experts".

The International Crisis Group welcomed the public release of the LLRC report but noted that it failed in a crucial task - "providing the thorough and independent investigation of alleged violations of international humanitarian and human rights law that the UN and other partners of Sri Lanka have been asking for". The ICG urged the international community to establish an independent international investigation in 2012.

=== Others ===
In an opinion piece in The New York Times the members of the UN Secretary-General's Panel of Experts on Accountability in Sri Lanka (Marzuki Darusman, Steven R. Ratner and Yasmin Sooka) criticised the LLRC report for ignoring or playing down their report's conclusions and for characterising the civilian deaths as a consequence of the army's response to Tamil Tiger shelling or cross-fire. They also criticised the report's recommendations that the army and the attorney general carry out further investigation as these organisations had ignored "governmental abuses for decades". Noting that the Sri Lankan government had failed to implement prior commissions recommendations and its "unwillingness to take concrete steps", they concluded that the only way for the truth to be exposed is for the United Nations Human Rights Council "to create an independent investigative body to determine the facts and identify those responsible".

The Global Tamil Forum (GTF), an umbrella group for Sri Lankan Tamil diaspora groups, has welcomed the report's publications, stating that its findings "only serve to emphasise the importance of establishing an international, independent accountability mechanism to investigate whether Government forces and the Liberation Tigers of Tamil Eelam (LTTE) breached any international law, committed war crimes and crimes against humanity in the last months of the war". The GTF acknowledged some the report's judgements and recommendations but noted that some of its conclusions on the prosecution of the conflict contradicted many of the findings of the UN Panel of Experts.

Editor-in-Chief of The Hindu — the Indian English-language daily — N. Ram in his 22 December 2011 editorial stated that the report has established a key fact — that there were "considerable" civilian casualties in the final stages of the military operation to crush the LTTE. The editorial went into detail that "Given the ethnic polarisation in Sri Lanka, these recommendations seem painfully insufficient. Even so, this is Sri Lanka's first attempt at introspection about the war. If the government is serious about reconciliation and learning lessons from the past, it must make a start by acting on the LLRC's recommendations."

Commenting on the LLRC report, Col. R. Hariharan, a retired Military Intelligence officer of the Indian Army and a columnist of South Asia Analysis Group, said that "LLRC report is constructive and covers almost all issues that relate to aberrations in governance, lack of transparency and the need to take speedy action on restoring confidence among Tamil minority." He also added "The report provides badly needed breathing space for the government, as the Commission has done a fairly good job if one goes by the President’s mandate given to it. The well written report analyses in detail the reasons for past and present discontent of Tamils and has drawn the government attention to a number issues that had triggered Tamil insurgency." In an opinion piece in The New York Times journalist Namini Wijedasa describes the report as "largely an apologia for the army" in respect of the events in the final stages of the civil war. According to Wijedasa, whilst the report makes sensible recommendations, exposes the grave atrocities committed by the LTTE and demonstrates that the government forces shelled the No Fire Zones, it only admits that civilians were killed by crossfire and blames the LTTE for most of the casualties. Wijedasa concludes that "Sri Lankans no longer need to pretend that the army didn’t shell zones where civilians were encouraged to gather [by the army], or subscribe to the fantasy that no innocents died when shells landed on or near hospitals".

Expressing his support to the LLRC, Australian Labor Party member of the Victorian Legislative Assembly Telmo Languiller said that LLRC report covers all relevant ground and sets the framework for practical reconciliation in Sri Lanka.

Namini Wijedasa, a Sri Lankan journalist, called the report "an apologia for the army". Even in the final weeks when the government took violent measures to defeat the LTTE, the commission only admitted, "civilian casualties had in fact occurred in the course of crossfire".

== UN Human Rights Council 19th session ==
Report by Lessons Learnt and Reconciliation Commission became the basis for the discussion on Sri Lanka at the United Nations Human Rights Council 19th session in March 2012. The council adopted a resolution on promoting reconciliation and accountability in Sri Lanka, urging the Sri Lankan government to implement constructive recommendations made in the LLRC report. The resolution welcomed the constructive recommendations contained in the report and noted with concern that the report did not adequately address serious allegations of violations of international law.

Two last-minute changes to the resolution, pressed by India, made it "unobtrusive" in nature and "non-judgemental" in approach. These amendments gave the government of Sri Lanka a veto over any future recommendations by the OHCHR. There was no reference to alleged war crimes or an international investigation, as called for by human rights groups.

== See also ==
- Report of the Secretary-General's Panel of Experts on Accountability in Sri Lanka
- Truth and reconciliation commission
