= War crimes in the final stages of the Sri Lankan civil war =

War crimes committed during the Sri Lankan civil war

- Part of Sri Lankan civil war
- Location: Sri Lanka
- Date: 2009
- Attack type: Shelling, Hostage taking, Forced disappearance, Denial of humanitarian aid, Summary execution, Rape, Internment, Use of underaged soldiers, Mass shootings, Suicide bombings
- Deaths: 40,000 civilians killed (UN, 2011) 146,000 civilians unaccounted 169,796 Tamil civilians Killed (ITJP, 2021) 70,000 civilians unaccounted (UN, 2012)
- Victims: Sri Lankan Tamil Civilians, Sinhalese people, Soldiers
- Perpetrators: Sri Lanka Armed Forces; Liberation Tigers of Tamil Eelam
- Motive: Suppressing LTTE insurgency (Sri Lankan Government); Creation of Tamil Eelam (LTTE)

The Sri Lanka Armed Forces and the Liberation Tigers of Tamil Eelam (Tamil Tigers) have been accused of committing war crimes during the final months of the Sri Lankan civil war in 2009. The war crimes include attacks on civilians and civilian buildings by both sides; executions of combatants and prisoners by both sides; enforced disappearances by the Sri Lankan military and paramilitary groups backed by them; sexual violence by the Sri Lankan military; the systematic denial of food, medicine, and clean water by the government to civilians trapped in the war zone; child recruitment, hostage taking, use of military equipment in the proximity of civilians and use of forced labor by the Tamil Tigers.

A panel of experts appointed by United Nations Secretary-General (UNSG) Ban Ki-moon to advise him on the issue of accountability with regard to any alleged violations of international human rights and humanitarian law during the final stages of the civil war found "credible allegations" which, if proven, indicated that war crimes and crimes against humanity were committed by the Sri Lankan military and the Tamil Tigers. It also found that as many as 40,000 Tamil civilians may have been killed in the final months of the civil war, a large majority as a result of indiscriminate shelling by the Sri Lankan Army. The panel has called on the UNSG to conduct an independent international inquiry into the alleged violations of international law and suspects prosecuted.

War crimes are prohibited by the Geneva Conventions, of which Sri Lanka is a signatory. In 2002 the International Criminal Court (ICC) was created by the Rome Statute to prosecute individuals for serious crimes, such as war crimes. Sri Lanka is not a signatory of the Rome Statute, so it is only possible for the ICC to investigate and prosecute war crimes in Sri Lanka if the UN Security Council were to refer Sri Lanka to the ICC. Formal Security Council involvement in the case of Sri Lanka, was opposed by the veto members Russia and China, as well as India among other council members. The UN Secretary-General called the Government of Sri Lanka to "respond constructively to the report" and stated that it is important that Sri Lanka set up its own probe for "genuine investigations" into the civil war actions.

The Sri Lankan government has denied that its forces committed any war crimes and has strongly opposed any international investigation. In March 2014 the United Nations Human Rights Council authorised an international investigation into the alleged war crimes.

On 21 March 2019 Sri Lanka co-sponsored a resolution made by the United Nations giving the country a 2-year deadline to establish a judicial mechanism to assess violation of humanitarian international law committed during the civil war.

== Background ==
The Tamil Tigers had been waging a full-scale war for an independent state of Tamil Eelam in the North and East of Sri Lanka since 1983. After the failure of the Norwegian mediated peace process in 2006 the Sri Lankan military launched offensives aimed at recapturing territory controlled by the Tamil Tigers. By July 2007 the military had recaptured all of the east. The military offensive in the north escalated in October 2008 as the Sri Lankan military attacked the Vanni heartland of the Tamil Tigers. After successive defeats the Tamil Tigers were forced to retreat to the north-east coast in Mullaitivu District. The civilian population of the Vanni also fled. The Sri Lankan government and human rights organisations have alleged that the civilians were forced to do so by the Tamil Tigers. By January 2009 the Tamil Tigers and the civilians were trapped in a small piece of land on the north-east coast.

According to the Sri Lankan the purpose of the Safe Zone was to allow the trapped civilians to cross into territory controlled by the military. However, very few civilians actually crossed into the military territory. The Sri Lankan military, UN and human rights organisations accused the Tamil Tigers of preventing the civilians from leaving.

The fighting between the military and the Tamil Tigers continued, causing the civilians to flee from the Safe Zone to a narrow strip of land between Nanthi Kadal lagoon and the Indian Ocean. On 12 February 2009 the military declared a new 10 square kilometres (3.9 sq mi) Safe Zone in this area, north-west of Mullaitivu town. Over the next three months a brutal siege of the Safe Zone or No-Fire-Zones (NFZ) occurred as the military allegedly blitzed by land and air the last remnants of Tamil Tigers trapped in the Safe Zone. Satellite images of the Safe Zone published by the UN, foreign governments and scientific organisations showed heavy damage that could have only been caused by bombardment. There is credible evidence that the LTTE itself wanted to deliberately create a humanitarian disaster.

Inevitably many thousands of civilians were killed or injured. A United Nations panel in 2011 found that as many as 40,000 Tamil civilians may have been killed in the final months of the civil war.

The UN, based on credible witness evidence from aid agencies as well civilians evacuated from the Safe Zone by sea, estimated that 6,500 civilians were killed and another 14,000 injured between mid-January, when the Safe Zone was first declared, and mid-April. There are no official casualty figures after this period but a report in The Times claims that civilian deaths increased to an average of 1,000 per day after mid-April 2009. The UN at the time had refused to confirm the Times' allegations. Older estimates of the death toll dating from May 2009 for the final four months of the civil war (mid-January to mid-May) range from 15,000 to 20,000.

A US State Department report has suggested that the actual casualty figures were probably much higher than these older UN's estimates and that significant numbers of casualties were not recorded. However, a study by the Sinhalese run Marga Institute of Sri Lanka arrives at a much lower figure, below 10,000. Lord Naseby using information obtained using the right to information, British diplomatic cables etc., also claimed that about 7000 deaths could have occurred. However, human rights groups accuse Lord Naseby of purposely distorting a snapshot of figures gathered by the UN in 2009, which contradict the later and more thorough investigation undertaken by the United Nations panel in 2011 which found that as many as 40,000 Tamil civilians may have been killed in the final months of the civil war. In 2014, the Daily Telegraph's chief political commentator Peter Oborne described Lord Naseby as an apologist for the Sri Lankan government, who had given misleading and inaccurate statements about the war.

As the civil war began to wind down in late April/early May the number of civilians leaving the Safe Zone increased substantially. On 19 May the Sri Lankan government declared victory.

After the end of the war a number of countries and human rights organisations called for an independent investigation into the final stages of the civil war, which has been consistently refused by the Sri Lankan government.

== Accusations ==
International organisations such as Amnesty International and Human Rights Watch have accused both sides in Sri Lanka's long-running conflict of deliberately putting civilians at risk to pursue military objectives. Nearly 70,000 people were displaced due to aerial bombardment and artillery attacks by government forces in Mullaitivu and Kilinochchi, the organisations said. And in the LTTE-controlled Vanni area, the Tigers have hindered thousands of families from moving to safer places by imposing a strict pass system and, in some instances, forcing some family members to stay behind to ensure the return of the rest of the family. These measures seem designed in part to use civilians as a buffer against government forces – a serious violation of international humanitarian law. "Both sides to this long conflict have again shown that they will jeopardise the lives of thousands of ordinary people in the pursuit of military objectives," said Amnesty International spokesperson Yolanda Foster. "In the absence of independent international monitors, Sri Lankan civilians lack protection and remain at the mercy of two forces with long records of abuse." Brad Adams, Asia director for Human Rights Watch said "The LTTE claims to be fighting for the Tamil people, but it is responsible for much of the suffering of civilians in the Vanni. As the LTTE loses ground to advancing government forces, their treatment of the very people they say they are fighting for is getting worse. By refusing to allow people their basic rights to freedom of movement, the LTTE has trapped hundreds of thousands of civilians in a dangerous war zone. Trapped in the LTTE's iron fist, ordinary Tamils are forcibly recruited as fighters and forced to engage in dangerous labor near the front lines".

The Sri Lankan government has vehemently rejected all claims that its forces committed war crimes. In a June 2010 speech, President Rajapaksa insisted that his soldiers did not kill a single civilian. "Our troops carried a gun in one hand and a copy of the human rights charter in the other," the president said. These statements are at odds with multiple independent sources; the United Nations itself has said that at least 7,000 ethnic Tamil civilians died in the first four months of last year, just before the government claimed final victory over the Tigers, and high-level United States officials have said, "The US has strong, credible allegations of evidence of atrocities during the prosecution of the war against the Tamil Tigers."

== United Nations ==
=== 11th special session of the UN Human Rights Council ===
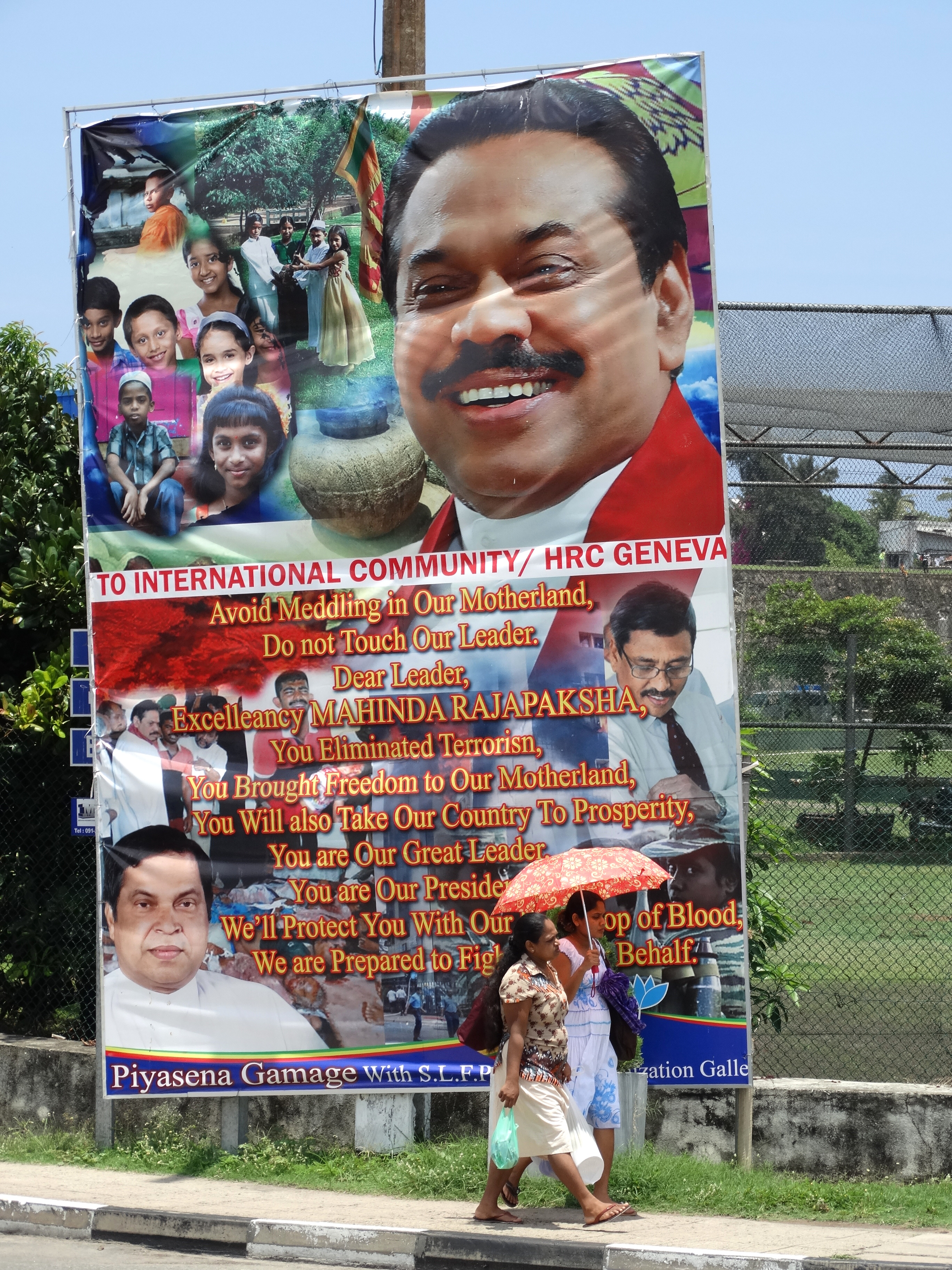
Party-sponsored messages of support for Rajapaksa against the UN seen in Galle, 2014

At the 11th special session of the United Nations Human Rights Council (UNHRC) in May 2009 seventeen countries attempted to get the UNHRC to investigate war crimes in Sri Lanka. They put forward a resolution that deplored abuses by both the Sri Lankan government forces and the Tamil Tigers, urged the government to co-operate fully with humanitarian organisations and to provide protection to civilians and displaced persons, and made an appeal to the Sri Lankan government to respect media freedom and investigate attacks against journalists and human rights defenders. This was thwarted after the Sri Lankan government received support from China, Russia, India and developing countries. The UNHRC instead passed resolution S-11/1 on 27 May 2009 which commended the Sri Lankan government's actions, condemned the Tamil Tigers and ignored allegations of violations of human rights and humanitarian law by government forces. This resolution was passed by 29 votes to 12 votes with 6 abstentions.

=== UN High Commissioner for Human Rights ===
On 25 October 2009 the Office of the United Nations High Commissioner for Human Rights called for an independent, international investigation of possible war crimes committed during the last few months of the war in Sri Lanka.

=== UN Secretary – General's advisory panel ===
In June 2010 UN Secretary-General Ban Ki-moon appointed a three-member panel of experts to advise him on whether war crimes were committed in the final stages of the civil war. The panel consisted of Marzuki Darusman (Indonesia – chair), Steven Ratner (USA) and Yasmin Sooka (South Africa). The panel looked into "accountability with regard to any alleged violations of international human rights and humanitarian law" and whether the commitment on "human rights accountability" given by Sri Lankan President Mahinda Rajapaksa to Ban Ki-moon has been implemented. The panel examined "the modalities, applicable international standards and comparative experience with regard to accountability processes, taking into account the nature and scope of any alleged violations in Sri Lanka".

The Sri Lankan government reacted angrily to the panel's appointment, calling it "an unwarranted and unnecessary interference with a sovereign nation". It stated that the panel would not be allowed to enter Sri Lanka, a move criticised by Darusman. The panel's appointment was welcomed by the United States and EU but criticised by Russia and China. The panel met for the first time on 19 July 2010.

On 12 April 2011 the panel handed over its report, the Report of the Secretary-General's Panel of Experts on Accountability in Sri Lanka, to the Secretary-General who passed on a copy to the Sri Lankan government. The Sri Lankan government immediately rejected the report as "fundamentally flawed" and "patently biased". The report was not initially made public to allow the Sri Lankan government time to make a formal reply. On 16 April 2011 the report was published in The Island, an-independently owned nationalist Sri Lankan newspaper. It had been suggested that the Sri Lankan government leaked the report so that it can issue a full rebuttal before of the report is officially made public by the UN. The Sri Lankan government did not make a formal reply and on 25 April 2011 the UN published the full report.

The evidence obtained by the panel revealed "a very different version of the final stages of the war than that maintained to this day by the Government of Sri Lanka". The panel found "credible allegations, which if proven, indicate that a wide range of serious violations of international humanitarian law and international human rights law were committed both by the Government of Sri Lanka and the LTTE, some of which would amount to war crimes and crimes against humanity". The panel concluded that the "conduct of the war represented a grave assault on the entire regime of international law designed to protect individual dignity during both war and peace".

The panel found "credible allegations" that the Sri Lankan military/government killed civilians through widespread shelling; shelled hospitals and humanitarian objects; denied humanitarian assistance; violated the human rights of civilians and Tamil Tiger combatants; and it violated the human rights of those outside the conflict zone such as the media. The panel found "credible allegations" that the Tamil Tigers used civilians as a human buffer; killed civilians attempting to escape Tamil Tiger control; used military equipment in the proximity of civilians; forcibly recruited children; used forced labour; and killed civilians using suicide attacks.

Specific findings of the panel:

In regard to crimes by the Sri Lankan government:

- The Sri Lankan military used large-scale and widespread shelling causing large numbers of civilian deaths. This constituted persecution of the population of the Vanni.
- The Sri Lankan government tried to intimidate and silence the media and other critics of the war using a variety of threats and actions, including the use of white vans to abduct and to make people disappear.
- The Sri Lankan military shelled on a large scale the three Safe Zones where it had encouraged the civilian population to concentrate. It did this even after saying it would cease using heavy weapons.
- The Sri Lankan military shelled the UN hub, food distribution lines and Red Cross ships coming to rescue the wounded and their relatives. It did this despite having intelligence as well as notifications by the UN, Red Cross and others.
- Most of the civilian casualties were caused by Sri Lankan military shelling.
- The Sri Lankan military systematically shelled hospitals on the frontlines. All hospitals in the Vanni were hit by mortars and artillery, sometimes repeatedly, despite the Sri Lankan military knowing their locations.
- The Sri Lankan government systematically deprived civilians in the conflict zone of humanitarian aid, in the form of food and medical supplies, adding to their suffering. The government deliberately underestimated the number of civilians in order to deprive them of humanitarian aid.
- Tens of thousands of civilians were killed between January and May 2009. Many died anonymously in the final days.
- The Sri Lankan government subjected the civilians who managed to escape the conflict zone to further deprivation and suffering.
- Screening for Tamil Tigers took place without any transparency or external scrutiny. Some of those separated by the screening were summarily executed whilst women were raped. Others simply disappeared.
- All IDPs were detained in closed overcrowded camps where they were deprived of their basic rights. The conditions in the camps resulted in many unnecessary deaths.
- There were interrogations and torture in the camps. Suspected Tamil Tigers were taken to other facilities where they faced further abuse.

In regard to the crimes of the Tamil Tigers:

- The Tamil Tigers kept hostage 330,000 civilians who were fleeing the shelling and trapped in an ever-decreasing area.
- The Tamil Tigers refused to allow civilians to leave the conflict zone and kept them as hostages.
- The Tamil Tigers forcibly recruited members during the whole of the civil war but this intensified during the final stages of the war. Some of the recruits were young as 14.
- The Tamil Tigers forced civilians to dig trenches, in the process risking making them look like combatants.
- The Tamil Tigers kept on fighting even when it became clear they had lost in order to save the lives of its leaders. This futile prolonging of the conflict resulted in many civilians dying unnecessarily.
- The Tamil Tigers shot at point blank any civilian trying to leave the conflict zone.
- The Tamil Tigers fired artillery from near civilians. They also stored military equipment near civilians and civilian structures such as hospitals.
- The Tamil Tigers carried out suicide attacks against civilians outside the conflict zone even during the final stages of the civil war.

The report states that the "credible allegations" demand a serious investigation and the prosecution of those responsible. If the allegations are proved senior commanders, military and political, on both sides are liable for prosecution under international criminal law. The panel noted the Sri Lankan government's attempt at accountability consisted solely of investigating the actions of the previous government and the Tamil Tigers, and not of the present government's actions during the final stages of the war. The panel concluded this is not in accordance with international standards and fell "dramatically short of international expectations". The panel found the Lessons Learnt and Reconciliation Commission (LLRC) established by the Sri Lankan government to be "deeply flawed" and not up to international standards of independence and impartiality due to the "deep-seated conflicts of interests" of some of its members. The mandate of the LLRC, its work and methodology meant that it was incapable of investigating the serious violations of international humanitarian and human rights law or of examining the causes of the civil war. The panel concluded that the LLRC could not satisfy the commitment on accountability given by President Rajapaksa and Ban Ki-moon.

The panel found that the Sri Lankan justice system was incapable of providing accountability. The independence of the Attorney General had been eroded and the continuation of Emergency Regulations and the Prevention of Terrorism Act precluded the judiciary from holding the government accountable on human rights issues. Military courts and other domestic institutions were also incapable of providing accountability. The panel found that the government's triumphalism and the Sri Lankan Tamil diaspora's inability to acknowledge the Tamil Tigers' role in the humanitarian disaster also hindered accountability.

The panel criticised the UN for not protecting civilians. Its reluctance to release casualty figures undermined the call to protect civilians.

The panel a number of recommendations including that there be an independent international inquiry into the alleged violations of international law and that the Sri Lankan government carry out genuine investigations of the alleged violations of international humanitarian and human rights law committed by both sides.

The panel of experts blames both sides for deaths, however with the LTTE leadership annihilated by government forces in May 2009, only the government forces could now be held accountable.

UN Secretary-General Ban Ki-moon has stated that he could not follow the recommendations of his advisory panel due to non-cooperation from the government. His spokesperson Martin Nesirky stated "In regard to the recommendation that he establish an international investigation mechanism, the Secretary-General is advised that this will require host country (Sri Lankan) consent or a decision from member states through an appropriate intergovernmental forum,". The Government of Sri Lanka has rejected the report stating that its biased and fraudulent. Human rights groups however, have described the government of being in denial about the atrocities committed. Without the consent of the host nation, or a decision by the UN Security Council, General Assembly, Human Rights Council or other international body, the UN Secretary-General was not able to move to set up a formal investigation of the civilian deaths in 2011 following the publication of the panel's report.

The UN expert panel report published in April 2011 has, based on its findings, recommended that the Human Rights Council reconsider resolution A/HRC/S-11/L.1/Rev.2.

=== 19th session of the UN Human Rights Council ===
At the 19th regular session in March 2012, the UNHRC adopted resolution 19/2 on promoting reconciliation and accountability in Sri Lanka by a vote of 24 in favour, 15 against and 8 abstentions. The resolution welcomed the constructive recommendations contained in the Lessons Learnt and Reconciliation Commission (LLRC), a commission of inquiry appointed by the Sri Lankan government to look back at the civil war, and noted with concern that the report did not adequately address serious allegations of violations of international law. It called upon the government of Sri Lanka to implement constructive recommendations made in the LLRC report and to take all necessary additional steps to fulfill its relevant legal obligations to initiate credible and independent actions to ensure justice, equity, accountability and reconciliation for all Sri Lankans. It requested the government to present an action plan detailing the steps that it has taken and will take to implement the recommendations made in the commission's report, and also to address alleged violations of international law. The resolution also encouraged the (OHCHR) to provide advice and technical assistance on implementing the above-mentioned steps; and requested the OHCHR to present a report on the provision of such assistance to the Human Rights Council at its 22nd session in March 2013. Two last-minute changes to the resolution, pressed by India, made it "unobtrusive" in nature and "non-judgemental" in approach. These amendments gave the Government of Sri Lanka, a veto over any future recommendations by the OHCHR. There was no reference to alleged war crimes or an international investigation, as called for by human rights groups.

=== 22nd session of the UN Human Rights Council ===
The failure of the Sri Lankan government to comply with resolution 19/2 led to resolution 22/1 being passed in March 2013 at the 22nd regular session of the UNHRC. This resolution called on the Sri Lankan government to carry out an independent and credible investigation into alleged violations. However, the resolution failed to establish the independent international investigation that human rights groups had called for.

=== 25th session of the UN Human Rights Council ===
The Sri Lankan government ignored the resolution and as a consequence in March 2014 the 25th session of the UNHRC passed resolution 25/1 authorising an international investigation into alleged war crimes during the 2002–09 period.

== US Congress report ==
In October 2009 the US State Department submitted a detailed report to Congress' Committees on Appropriations on incidents that happened during the final months of the conflict in Sri Lanka. The report detailed allegations that the majority of shelling into the Safe Zone was from Sri Lankan government forces; the government forces carried out shelling during a 48-hour "ceasefire"; the government forces unlawfully killed captives and combatants seeking to surrender, including senior Tamil Tigers; the government forces and paramilitary groups abducted and then killed Tamil civilians, particularly children and young men; there was an acute shortage of food, medicine and clean water despite government assurances that it would supply sufficient amounts; the Tamil Tigers forcibly prevented the escape of IDPs and used them as human shields; the Tamil Tigers shot civilians who were trying to escape; and that the Tamil Tigers forcibly recruited children. The report surmised that the allegations in the report "may constitute violations of international humanitarian law and/or crimes against humanity, and...human rights abuses".

The Sri Lankan government rejected the report but Stephen Rapp, the United States Ambassador-at-Large for War Crimes Issues, subsequently called on Sri Lanka to investigate the allegations stating that sources used in the report "were credible and reliable and that allegations had been corroborated".

== Sunday Leader: "White flag" case ==
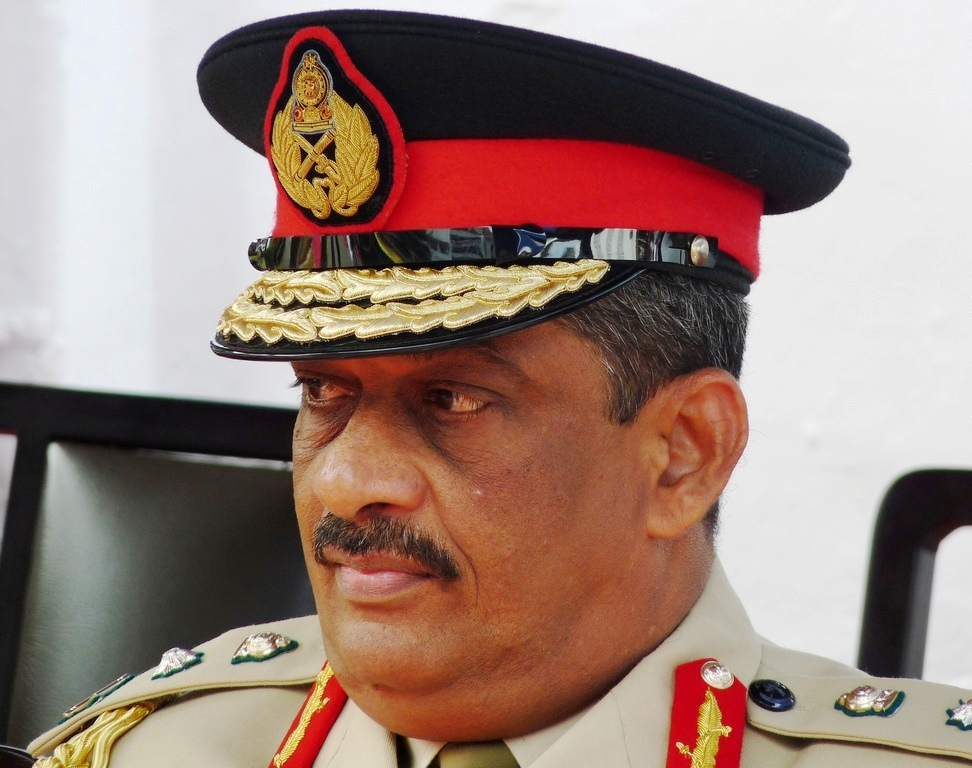
Field Marshal Sarath Fonseka

On 13 December 2009 The Sunday Leader newspaper published an interview with General Sarath Fonseka, commander of the Sri Lankan armed forces during the final months of the war, in which he claimed that Defence Secretary Gotabhaya Rajapaksa had ordered an army commander at the battlefront to shoot dead all Tamil Tiger leaders who tried to surrender. Fonseka claimed that during the final days of the civil war senior Tamil Tiger leaders were trying to arrange their surrender by communicating with Basil Rajapaksa, senior adviser to President Rajapaksa, via Norway and other foreign governments. Basil Rajapaksa then informed his brother Gotabhaya Rajapaksa about the attempts surrender. Fonseka claimed that Gotabhaya Rajapaksa ordered Brigadier Shavendra Silva, commander of the Sri Lankan Army's 58 Division, not to allow the Tamil Tiger leaders to surrender and directed that "they must all be killed". Two Tamil Tiger leaders, Balasingham Nadesan and Seevaratnam Pulidevan, contacted Norwegian minister Erik Solheim and The Sunday Times journalist Marie Colvin and stated that they wanted to surrender. Solheim informed the Red Cross in Colombo who in turn informed the Sri Lankan government. Fonseka claimed that the Rajapaksa brothers, via foreign governments, told the Tamil Tigers leaders to "Get a piece of white cloth, put up your hands and walk towards the other side in a non-threatening manner". Fonseka claimed that on the night of 17/18 May 2009 Nadesan, Pulidevan, Ramesh and their families were all shot dead by the Sri Lankan Army as they tried to surrender.

There was uproar in Sri Lanka when the "Sunday Leader" article was published. The government's Human Rights Minister, Mahinda Samarasinghe, said General Fonseka's statements were lies that had damaged the image of the country, and characterised them as the biggest betrayal of its kind in Sri Lanka's history. As an apparent consequence of the "Sunday Leader" article, and just twelve days after his evident defeat in the Sri Lankan presidential election, General Fonseka was arrested by military forces on 8 February 2010. The military based the arrest, it said, on allegations of "committing military offences", but it offered no details. The director general of the government's Media Centre for National Security told state TV that Fonseka will be tried by a military tribunal. His ongoing detention was subsequently attributed to civil and criminal charges including inciting the public against the government. During the previous month's run-up to the presidential election, Fonseka and his aides had moved into a luxurious Colombo hotel on 26 January 2010, election day. According to Time magazine, "The hotel was soon surrounded by military. Fonseka complained that there was a threat to his life and that the government was limiting his movements. Authorities claimed that security had been increased around the hotel as a precaution, although several former military officers working on the Fonseka campaign were arrested as they left the hotel."

On 12 May 2010, after three months in military custody, the general said, according to the BBC, that the "Sunday Leader" newspaper had misquoted him, that he was innocent of any attempt to incite the public, and that the case was part of an attempt to silence him. Then, while still in military custody, Fonseka seemed to downplay his earlier claim that Defence Secretary Gotabhaya Rajapaksa had ordered the killing of Tamil Tiger rebels as they were trying to surrender in May 2009. The BBC's Charles Haviland in Colombo noted, however, that Fonseka never made a blanket denial that no war crimes had been committed, but rather stipulated that no war crimes took place to his knowledge. Next, in a 7 June 2010 interview with the BBC's Hard Talk programme Defence Secretary Rajapaksa threatened to execute Fonseka if he testified at an independent war crimes investigation, stating "He can't do that..That is a treason. We will hang him if he do that." The next day, 8 June 2010, General Fonseka denied having told lies or having committing treason when speaking of the possibility of war crimes being committed during fighting against Tamil Tiger rebels.

After his arrest Fonseka was charged with a number of civilian and military offences. On 13 August 2010 Fonseka was found guilty of engaging in politics while on active service by a court martial. He was stripped of his rank and medals. On 17 September 2010 Fonseka was found guilty of breaching arms procurement guidelines (corruption) by a court martial. He was sentenced to 30 months rigorous imprisonment and stripped of his parliamentary seat. Fonseka was tried in a civilian court on accusations of spreading public disaffection in respect of the "white flag" case. He was sentenced to 3 years in prison on 18 November 2011.

During a counter-insurgency seminar conducted by Sri Lanka Army in June 2011, Lawrence Smith – an attaché of the American embassy in Sri Lanka from 2008 revealed "...from what I was privileged to hear and to see, the offers to surrender that I am aware of seemed to come from the mouthpieces of the LTTE – Nadesan, KP – people who weren't and never had really demonstrated any control over the leadership or the combat power of the LTTE. So their offers were a bit suspect anyway, and they tended to vary in content hour by hour, day by day. I think we need to examine the credibility of those offers before we leap to conclusions that such offers were in fact real..." However the US State Department characterized the statement as "personal opinion".

== Permanent Peoples' Tribunal ==
Between 14 and 16 January 2010 the Permanent Peoples' Tribunal held a Tribunal on Sri Lanka in Dublin, Ireland to investigate allegations that the Sri Lankan armed forces committed war crimes and crimes against humanity during its final phase of the war, and to examine violations of human rights in the aftermath of the war and the factors that led to the collapse of the 2002 ceasefire. The tribunal's 11-member panel of judges consisted of François Houtart (chair), Daniel Feierstein, Denis Halliday, Eren Keskin, Mary Lawlor, Francesco Martone, Nawal El Saadawi, Rajinder Sachar, Sulak Sivaraksa, Gianni Tognoni and Oystein Tveter. The tribunal received reports from NGOs and human rights groups, victims' testimony, eye-witness accounts including from members of the Sri Lankan armed forces, expert testimony, journalistic reports, video footage and photographs. Parts of the tribunal were held in camera to protect the identity of witnesses. The tribunal found the Sri Lankan government guilty of war crimes and crimes against humanity.

The tribunal found numerous instances of human rights violations committed by the Sri Lankan government. Violations between 2006 (end of the ceasefire) and 2009 (end of the war) included: bombing civilian objectives like hospitals, schools and other non-military targets; bombing government-proclaimed 'safety zones' or 'no fire zones'; withholding of food, water, and health facilities in war zones; use of heavy weaponry, banned weapons and air-raids; using food and medicine as a weapon of war; mistreatment, torture and execution of captured or surrendered Tamil Tiger combatants, officials and supporters; torture; rape and sexual violence against women; deportations and forcible transfer of individuals and families; and desecration of the dead. Violations committed in the IDP camps included: shooting of Tamil citizens and Tamil Tiger supporters; forced disappearances; rape; malnutrition; and lack of medical supplies. There was also evidence of forced "disappearances" of targeted individuals from the Tamil population during the ceasefire (2002–2006).

The tribunal concluded that the human rights violations during the war (2006–2009) "clearly constitute war crimes committed by the Sri Lankan Government, its security forces and aligned paramilitary forces, as defined under the Geneva Conventions and in the Rome Statute (Article 8)." Sri Lanka is a signatory of the Geneva Convention but not the Rome Statute. The tribunal found that war crimes were committed irrespective of whether the civil war was considered to be an international conflict or as an internal armed conflict. The tribunal also found that human rights violations committed in the IDP camps and the forced disappearances during the ceasefire (2002–2006) "clearly constitute crimes against humanity" as defined under Article 7 of the Rome Statute. The tribunal could not find enough evidence to justify the charge of genocide but it requested that a thorough investigation be held as some of the evidence it had received indicated "possible acts of genocide". The tribunal could also not find enough evidence to justify the charge of crimes against the peace. The tribunal stated that the crimes committed by the Sri Lankan government against the Tamil Tigers could not be justified because "neither war crimes, nor crimes against humanity would be justified by any act committed by the victims". The tribunal found that the US and UK undermined the ceasefire by pressurising the EU into designating the Tamil Tigers as a terrorist organisation. This allowed the Sri Lankan government to restart the war and thus commit the human rights violations.

The tribunal made a number of recommendations to the Sri Lankan government, UN and international community, including that a UN special rapporteur be appointed to "investigate and identify responsibilities for human rights violations, violations of humanitarian law and war crimes committed by all parties in conflict". The tribunal's findings were completely rejected by the Sri Lankan government.

== International Crisis Group report ==
In May 2010 the International Crisis Group published a detailed report on war crimes during the final months of the civil war. The report collated vast amounts of evidence including numerous reliable eyewitness statements, hundreds of photographs, video, satellite images, electronic communications and documents from multiple credible sources. The report concluded that war crimes were committed by the Sri Lankan armed forces and the Tamil Tigers.

The report found credible evidence of intentional shelling of civilians by the Sri Lankan armed forces; intentional shelling of hospitals by the Sri Lankan armed forces; intentional shelling of humanitarian operations by the Sri Lankan armed forces; deliberate obstruction of food and medical treatment for the civilian population by the Sri Lankan armed forces; intentional shooting of civilians by the Tamil Tigers; and intentional infliction of suffering on civilians by the Tamil Tigers. The report found evidence that suggested that during 2009 tens of thousands of Tamil civilians were killed, countless wounded and hundreds of thousands deprived of basic food and medical care which resulted in further, unnecessary deaths. The report suggested that the actions of some members of the international community produced conditions which allowed war crimes to be committed.

The report made a number of recommendations, particularly that there should be an international investigation into alleged war crimes. The report stated that it was impossible for any domestic (Sri Lankan) investigation into the government/security forces to be impartial "given the entrenched culture of impunity". The report noted that although Sri Lanka was not a member of the International Criminal Court and the UN Security Council was unlikely to refer Sri Lanka to the ICC, individual countries may investigate and prosecute alleged culprits over whom they have jurisdiction, such as those with dual-nationality. Sri Lanka's Defence Secretary Gotabhaya Rajapaksa holds dual US-Sri Lankan citizenship and Sarath Fonseka, commander of the Sri Lankan armed forces during the final months of the war, has a US Green Card .

== European Center for Constitutional and Human Rights vs Major General Jagath Dias ==
Following the end of the civil war many senior Sri Lankan military officers were appointed to diplomatic positions abroad. Major General Jagath Dias, who had been commander of 57 Division during the final stages of the civil war, was appointed deputy ambassador to Germany, Switzerland and the Vatican.

In January 2011 the European Center for Constitutional and Human Rights, a German human rights group, sent a dossier detailing alleged war crimes committed by the 57 Division to the German Federal Foreign Office The ECCHR followed the military offensives as described by the Sri Lankan military, examined reports produced by the Sri Lankan government and NGOs, and talked to eyewitnesses present in the conflict area. The dossier concluded that many violations of international law were committed by the Sri Lankan military and the Tigers, particularly war crimes. The dossier supports the view of the US embassy in Colombo that the senior military and civilian leaders were responsible for these crimes. The dossier urges the German government to investigate Dias' individual criminal responsibility, withdraw his diplomatic visa and declare him persona non-grata.

In August 2011 the Society for Threatened Peoples and TRIAL – Swiss Association against Impunity filed a criminal complaint with the Public Ministry of Switzerland against Dias for alleged war crimes. Dias dismissed the war crimes allegations as "baseless, unfounded and non-substantiated allegations. Fictions, not facts". The Swiss government subsequently confirmed it had discussed the alleged war crimes with Dias. On 14 September 2011 Dias was recalled to Sri Lanka. The Sri Lankan government claimed that he was returning to Sri Lankan because his two-year term had come to an end but reports in the media suggested that he had been stripped of his diplomatic immunity and the recall was to prevent war crimes charges being filed against him. The Swiss federal prosecutor has announced that a criminal investigation against Dias would commence if he ever returned to Switzerland.

== Channel 4: Sri Lanka's Killing Fields ==
A compilation of amateur videos from the civil war was presented by Jon Snow as a 50-minute special titled Sri Lanka's Killing Fields on Channel 4 on 14 June 2011. The special features films shot during the last stages of the war that appear to show the shelling of areas in the no-fire zone and the aftermath, executions of captured LTTE combatants and dead female Tamil fighters being loaded on to a truck. Videos used in the first half were shot by individuals in the no-fire zone while the latter half seemingly shows mobile phone footage shot by the Sri Lankan soldiers. The same program was broadcast in Australia on ABC TV 4 Corners program on 4 July 2011 presenting allegations that up to 40,000 Tamil civilians were killed by shelling or executions after surrender in many cases after being sexually abused.

In response to the video, the Sri Lankan government questioned Channel 4's "standards and fairness".

Criticism has been levelled at the program from some parties. A. A. Gill of The Sunday Times wrote "Not a second of this has been shot by Channel 4; none of the eyewitness accounts comes from journalists" and said "Jon Snow's commentary was intemperate and partisan, and it was all held together by assumptions". According to the Sri Lankan Ministry of Defence, Sri Lanka's permanent representatives to the United Nations highlighted what they claimed were inconsistencies in the documentary. Ofcom investigated Channel 4's documentary after more than 100 complaints were received saying that it was misleading and misrepresentative. However, Ofcom later found the documentary to be 'not in breach' of any regulations.

In July 2011, Channel 4 exclusively revealed two individuals who witnessed the final violent stage in May 2009 who claimed a military commander and Sri Lanka's defence secretary ordered war crimes. One stated "They shot people at random. Stabbed people. Raped them. Cut out their tongues, cut women's breasts off. I saw people soaked in blood."

== Evidence ==
In addition to the evidence of alleged war crimes produced by the organisations detailed above, the following evidence have been published/broadcast independently.

=== Satellite images ===
A number of independent organisations have published analysis of satellite images of the Safe Zone showing heavy damage that could only have been caused by shelling and aerial bombardment. These contradicted Sri Lankan government claims that its forces had not used aerial bombardment or heavy weaponry.

A confidential UN report dated 26 April 2009 comparing UNOSAT images of the Safe Zone taken between 5 February 2009 and 19 April 2009 was leaked to the media. The images showed numerous craters caused by shelling. The main finding of the report was that "there are new indications of building destruction and damages resulting from shelling and possible air-strikes". The report found that 60 main buildings had been destroyed to date in the Safe Zone but this excluded temporary structures erected by the IDPs as it was not possible to identify damage to these using satellite images. Over 5,000 IDP shelters had also been relocated during April 2009 due to the shelling and bombardment. There was evidence of hundreds of craters and heavy damage to buildings outside the Safe Zone. The report concluded that damage estimates were a minimum and that the "actual damages are likely to be greater". The accuracy of some of the damage suggested that it could only have been done by air-dropped bombs. Although the report does not apportion blame, given that Tamil Tigers' air wing had been destroyed in early 2009, this damage could only have been caused by the Sri Lankan Air Force. After being confronted with the UN satellite images during an interview with Al Jazeera Sri Lankan Foreign Secretary Palitha Kohona admitted that the Sri Lankan armed forces had carried out shelling and air raids in the Safe Zone. This contradicted the statements by the Sri Lankan government and President Rajapaksa, and an earlier statement by Kohona himself, that there was no shelling by the Sri Lankan armed forces in the Safe Zone.

Following a request from Amnesty International and Human Rights Watch the American Association for the Advancement of Science compared commercial high-resolution satellite images of the Safe Zone taken on 6 May 2009 and 10 May 2009 to evaluate the impact of heavy fighting on 9/10 May. They found evidence of significant removal of IDP shelters, artillery and mortar emplacements, destroyed permanent structures, bomb shell impact craters and 1,346 individual graves. By calculating the trajectory of the shells which caused the craters the AAAS was able to conclude that the shells likely came from Sri Lankan Army territory.

US government satellites had been monitoring the war zone secretly. In April 2009 the US State Department released two satellite images of the Safe Zone showing 100,000 civilians trapped in 8-square-mile (21 km^{2}) area. The State Department report to Congress (above) included a number of images taken by US government satellites. The images showed that Puthukkudiyiruppu Hospital had been heavily damaged between 28 January 2009 and 16 March 2009.

=== Video ===
In May 2009 New Delhi TV reported that it had received a video of what is alleged to be Tamil Tigers forcing civilians to work as labourers to aid their defence effort. The video is alleged to have been found on a dead Tamil Tiger. The video is said to show Tamil Tigers in civilian clothing firing at fleeing civilians as well as the Sri Lankan military.

On 25 August 2009 Britain's Channel 4 News broadcast mobile phone video of gunmen alleged to be Sri Lankan soldiers apparently summarily executing eight bound and blindfolded Tamil men at point-blank range in January 2009. The video was alleged to have been taken by a Sri Lankan government soldier and to have been circulating amongst soldiers before Journalists for Democracy in Sri Lanka, a group of exiled Sri Lankan journalists, obtained it.

The Sri Lankan government rejected the video footage, calling it a fabrication. It established a four-member panel of Sri Lankan experts (Siri Hewawitharana, Chatura Ranjan de Silva, Brigadier Prasad Samarasinghe and Major P. A. Bandara) to investigate the authenticity of the video. This panel produced a technical analysis of the video in early September which concluded that the video was fake.

An investigation by a UN commissioned panel of independent experts (Peter Diaczuk, Daniel Spitz and Jeff Spivack) found that the video was authentic. In a point-by-point repudiation of the Sri Lankan government's assessment, the experts concluded that the reaction and movement of the victims' bodies and blood evidence were consistent with being shot; the movement of the weapon and the shooter and the gases expelled from the muzzle were consistent with live ammunition firing, not blank cartridges; there was no evidence of breaks in continuity in the video, no additional video layers; and no evidence of image manipulation; and that video had been filmed on a mobile phone, not a camcorder, as the Sri Lankan government's analysis had maintained. The experts were unable to explain the movement of certain victims in the video, 17 frames at the end of the video and the date of 17 July 2009 encoded in the video (the conflict was officially declared over in May 2009) but this did not invalidate its authenticity.

The independent experts' findings led Philip Alston, UN Special Rapporteur on extrajudicial, summary or arbitrary executions, to call for "an independent inquiry to carry out an impartial investigation into war crimes and other grave violations of international humanitarian and human rights law allegedly committed in Sri Lanka."

=== Photographs ===
In October 2010 the Global Tamil Forum (GTF), an umbrella group for Tamil diaspora groups, published photographs that appeared to show the massacre of civilians and execution of Tamil Tigers. The photos showed blood stained bodies of young men and women with blindfolds and hands tied behind their backs. The GTF could not verify the authenticity of the photographs. It had obtained them from a Tamil Tiger intelligence official who said they had obtained the photos from someone in the Sri Lankan Army. The Sri Lankan government rejected the photos as an attempt to tarnish Sri Lanka's image.

On 10 November 2010 Al Jazeera broadcast photographs that appeared to show the aftermath of Sri Lankan Army soldiers massacring civilians and executing Tamil Tigers in the final stages of the civil war. The graphic images showed dead bodies piled on top of each other, often naked. One of the photos showed what is believed to be the dead body of Prabhakaran's son. Some of the photos showed naked bodies with blindfolds and hands tied behind their backs. They appear to have been executed. Al Jazeera could not verify the authenticity of the photographs. It had obtained them from Tamils who said they had obtained the photos from someone in the Sri Lankan military. The Sri Lankan government reacted by calling the photos lies and fabrications. It claimed that some of the photos were the same as those broadcast by Channel 4 News in May 2010. Amnesty International reacted by stating that the photos were evidence that there needs to be an independent international investigation into what happened in the final stages of the civil.

=== Eyewitness accounts and statements by opposing leaders ===
A young pastor from Mullaithivu who was in the final war zone reported seeing shells landing randomly on 16 May 2009. He also saw many dead bodies and people crying out for food and water. He surrendered to the army the next day, along with four other pastors and sixty orphans under his care. He stated the following:

"I went with another pastor and a white flag...we explained who we were, and they told everyone to come forward out of the bunker. They ordered us to kneel down. There were about fifteen soldiers. Their faces were covered with black cloth. One soldier said, in Sinhala—I understand a little—'We have orders to shoot everyone.' We were shouting for them not to shoot".

The pastor's group was then allowed to leave, but not before some were physically and verbally abused. He described a fellow pastor being beaten:

"A pastor came behind me, but he was punched in the chest by a soldier. He fell down. He died later that day. The same soldier who hit him stuck his fingers in the wounds of the young men with us who had been injured".

He further added:

"At the end, we were walking out through fire and past dead people, and the soldiers were laughing at us and saying, 'We have killed all your leaders. Now you are our slaves.'”

Other civilians who managed to escape the war zone claimed that the Tamil Tigers had shot at injured civilians fleeing the fighting. It was claimed that the Tigers were keeping them human shields as well using them as fighters, a charge denied by the Tigers. The civilians' claims were corroborated by Tamil Tiger officials who surrendered to the Sri Lankan Army. Pakkiyavathi, a civilian who managed to escape the war zone describes how LTTE cadres shot escaping Tamil civilians:

"People take great risks to escape. They have to walk for days braving shelling. If [Tamil Tiger] cadres spot them they will fire at them... A few days ago more than 200 people tried to cross over to the government-controlled areas on their own. [Tamil Tiger] cadres fired at them, one was killed."

A family who escaped the war zone in a large group of an estimated 60,000 people said that when their group attempted to cross the Nanthikadal lagoon, the LTTE cadres fired and shelled the civilians, killing many of them. A youth who was travelling with 12 others in the same group stated that a shell from the LTTE struck his group and killed the other 12.

Civilians who managed to escape the war zone also claimed that Tamil Tigers stole most of the humanitarian aid and sold it on to the people.

The LTTE increased their forced recruitment practices during the final stages of the civil war. Children and adults were forcibly recruited by LTTE and those who tried to avoid recruitment were met with strict punishments. Kauruppaiah Ganapathipillai, a civilian who managed to escape the war zone recounted the following:

"The Tigers are increasing the recruitment of children. Now one cannot even send the children out to fetch water. They are even taking 14-year-old kids. In some cases which I know they have taken four to five people from the same family..."

On 18 May 2010 Channel 4 News broadcast interviews with two Sri Lankan soldiers who claimed that they had been given orders from "the top" to summarily execute all ethnic Tamils, civilians as well as fighters. A senior commander claimed "the order would have been to kill everybody and finish them off..It is clear that such orders were...from the top". Sri Lankan Defence Secretary Gotabhaya Rajapaksa, President Rajapaksa's brother, was said to have given direct orders to army commanders at the battle front. It was also claimed in the story that Velupillai Prabhakaran's 13-year-old son Balachandran was interrogated by the Sri Lankan military before being shot. A front line soldier said "our commander ordered us to kill everyone. We killed everyone". The soldier claimed that the Tamils were tortured before being executed. Numerous photos taken by Sri Lankan soldiers showing dead bodies and Tamil prisoners were also shown in the broadcast.

One of the soldiers who served in the 58 Division of the Sri Lankan Army tearfully recounted the heinous crimes committed by fellow soldiers in 2009:

"They shoot people at random, stab people, rape them, cut their tongues out, cut women’s breasts off. I have witnessed all this with my own eyes.

I saw a lot of small children, who were so innocent, getting killed in large numbers. A large number of elders were also killed.

If they wanted to rape a Tamil girl, they could just beat her and do it. If her parents tried to stop them, they could beat them or kill them. It was their empire.

I saw the naked dead bodies of women without heads and other parts of their bodies. I saw a mother and child dead and the child’s body was without its head".

An army insider also witnessed indiscriminate massacres on 18 May 2009, and stated the following:

"I saw this shooting of surrenderees take place a number of times. A number of groups, some 50, some 75, some more than 25 would come forward and they would all be killed. That included children, small children, women and old people... This was widespread killing. If journalists were around then the civilians were allowed to surrender, but when the journalists were not around the orders were to kill everyone".

Subramaniuim Sivakami alias Thamilini, the women's political wing leader of the LTTE, recounts her experiences in her book, “ In the Shadow of a Sword". She decided to surrender to the Sri Lankan army after she learnt about the instructions given by the LTTE leadership to shoot at the legs of Tamils crossing over to government-controlled areas. Thamilini refused to follow the orders given by LTTE leadership. She states:

"It was then I realized something was seriously wrong with us… we were no more the saviours, we had turned on our own people…"

She decided to throw away her Tiger uniform and the cyanide capsule, changed into civilian clothes and joined a group of civilians crossing over to the government-controlled areas.

She further talks about the increased forced recruitment practices of the LTTE during the final stages of the war. She states the following:

"My stand is that the most important among the worst decisions taken by leader Prabhakaran was the one to conscript youth by force. When the organisation arrived at the decision to conscript in order to increase the man power, people began to see another devilish face of the organisation."

=== Eyewitness accounts from members of the Sri Lankan Army ===
In 2012, Ravindra Watudura Bandanage a former captain of the Sri Lankan Army who had deserted and fled to Canada in 2009, where he had told Canadian immigration officials that he was aware that the Sri Lankan Government tortured Tamil civilians during the war. Bandanage testified at his refugee hearing that he was ordered by a colonel to place a bomb at the home of M. K. Shivajilingam a member of the Sri Lankan Parliament. During this Shivajilingam time was an outspoken critic of the government and was aligned with the opposition the Tamil National Alliance. Bandanage refused to go through with any of these orders and admitted to seeing members of the Sri Lankan army torturing, beating and raping Tamil civilians. As per the article published in the Canadian National Post these new allegations against the Sri Lankan army are "raising new questions about military abuses committed during the island nation's long civil war." The Sri Lankan Defence Ministry responded to the Bandanage's revelations in the National Post, stating that Bandanage who had joined the army in 1993 had gone AWOL in 2009 and had been discharged from the army, with his commission withdrawn in absentia. Subsequently, he had fled to Canada seeking refugee status. Release stated that from 2006 until his desertion, Bandanage was stationed in and around Colombo. The Defence Ministry rejected his claims and stated that these have been made to "stake his claim for a refugee states in Canada".

=== Eyewitness accounts from members of the LTTE ===
Two top LTTE leaders – Daya Master, the former media coordinator, and George Master, official interpreter of a LTTE strategist, who surrendered to the Sri Lankan Army admitted that Tamil Tigers were holding civilians hostage and also killed civilians who were trying to escape. George Master said "LTTE stopped people from leaving, but the strong managed to escape. The LTTE killed many fleeing civilians". Daya Master recounted the crimes committed by LTTE as follows:

"The LTTE is still using innocent civilians as hostages. They don't let them go out of the areas controlled by them. 'Viduthalai Puligal' (LTTE cadres) have killed a number of people in Sudanthirapuram area when they tried to flee from them... More than 200 people lost their lives at the hands of LTTE in that one area... People who were born after 1994, 95 and even 96 have been forced by the LTTE to fight. They were recruited forcibly... they (LTTE) did not even spare the families which had only one child... They did not spare even people who were sick and were suffering from heart diseases... they recruited everyone and attacked people who refused to heed."

== Commentary by notable personalities/entities ==
=== Arundhati Roy ===
In an opinion piece, once again in The Guardian (1 April 2009), Arundhati Roy made a plea for international attention to what she called a possible government-sponsored genocide of Tamils in Sri Lanka. She cited reports of camps into which Tamils were being herded as part of what she described as "a brazen, openly racist war". She also mentioned that the "Government of Sri Lanka is on the verge of committing what could end up being genocide" and described the Sri Lankan IDP camps where Tamil civilians are being held as concentration camps. A Sinhalese writer Ru Freeman called Roy's remarks "ill-informed and hypocritical" and criticized her for "whitewashing the atrocities of the LTTE". Roy has said of such accusations: "I cannot admire those whose vision can only accommodate justice for their own and not for everybody. However I do believe that the LTTE and its fetish for violence was cultured in the crucible of monstrous, racist, injustice that the Sri Lankan government and to a great extent Sinhala society visited on the Tamil people for decades."

=== Claude Heller ===
Claude Heller, Mexico's Ambassador to the United Nations and president of the United Nations Security Council said, 'We demand that the LTTE immediately lay down arms, renounce terrorism, allow a UN-assisted evacuation of the remaining civilians in the conflict area, and join the political process.' He added that they 'strongly condemned the LTTE, a terrorist organisation, for the use of civilians as human shields and for not allowing them to leave the area'. He also urged the Sri Lankan government to "abide by international humanitarian law" with regards to access to refugees. The meeting was not a formal session of the Security Council and the president's statements were non-binding.

=== Chris Patten ===
In an Op-Ed contribution in The New York Times (12 January 2010), Chris Patten made the comment, ".....After all, both General Fonseka and Mr. Rajapaksa executed the 30-year conflict to its bloody conclusion at the expense of huge numbers of Tamil civilian casualties.

By early May, when the war was ending, the United Nations estimated that some 7,000 civilians had died and more than 10,000 had been wounded in 2009 as the army's noose was being drawn tight around the remaining rebels and hundreds of thousands of noncombatants, who could not escape government shelling. The final two weeks likely saw thousands more civilians killed, at the hands of both the army and the rebels.

=== David Miliband and Bernard Kouchner ===
In "The Opinion Pages" contribution in The New York Times (20 June 2011), David Miliband and Bernard Kouchner made the comment,

In April 2009, we travelled together as foreign ministers to Sri Lanka, as 25 years of fighting between the Sri Lankan government and the Tamil Tigers neared its end.

The remaining fighters were trapped in the northernmost part of the country – along with large numbers of civilians. U.N. estimates put the numbers of civilians there in the last few months of the war at over 300,000.

We visited refugee camps that had been created to house Tamil refugees from Jaffna. Their stories were brutal and shocking. Random shelling in areas of fighting – including after the government had announced an end to fighting. Men and boys taken away from refugee camps – and now out of contact. Tamil life treated as fourth or fifth class. If foreign policy is about anything, it should be about stopping this kind of inhumanity.............Restrictions on journalism meant that there was a war without witness in Sri Lanka.............It seems to us essential that this process is taken forward. As the report says, accountability is a duty under domestic and international law, and those responsible, including Sri Lanka Army commanders and senior government officials, would bear criminal liability for international crimes.............Kofi Annan has said that the international community cannot be selective in its approach to upholding the rule of law. We therefore call on our governments to set a deadline, soon, for satisfactory response from the Sri Lankan government, and if it is not forthcoming to initiate the international arrangements recommended by the report.............Reports like the one compiled for the secretary general must not stand on the shelf. They must be the basis of action. Or the law becomes an ass."

In April 2009, ministers David Miliband and Bernard Kouchner issued a join statement accusing the LTTE of using civilians as a human shield. The statement said:

"It is clear that the LTTE has been forcefully preventing civilians from leaving the conflict area and we deplore their determination to use civilians as a human shield. We urge President Rajapakse to announce a new pause. Democratic governments are rightly held to higher standards for civilian protection than terrorist organizations. We also urge the LTTE to allow civilians to move to safety. We do of course continue to call on the LTTE to renounce terrorism and lay down their arms as a necessary element for a long-term solution."

=== M.I.A. and Jan Jananayagam ===
Throughout her career, M.I.A has used networking sites such as Twitter and MySpace to discuss and highlight the human rights abuses Sri Lanka is accused of perpetrating against Tamils. M.I.A. has joined other activists in condemning the actions of the Sri Lankan government against the Tamils during the civil war as "systematic genocide". Sri Lanka's Foreign Secretary denied that his country perpetrated genocide, responding that he felt M.I.A. was "misinformed" and that she should "stay with what she's good at, which is music, not politics." She claimed that the Sri Lankan government has accused her of being a "terrorist sympathiser", and that government agents have threatened her fans with prosecution if they post her music videos on the internet. M.I.A. endorsed candidate Jan Jananayagam at the 2009 European Parliament election, a last minute candidate and long standing critic of multiple international policy failures towards the Tamil national self-determination question, who stood on a platform of anti-genocide, civil liberties, financial transparency, the environment and women's rights and became the most successful independent election candidates ever in UK electoral history. Death threats directed at M.I.A. and her son have followed her activism, which she also cited as an influence on the songs on her album Maya. In 2010, she condemned China's role in supporting and supplying arms to the Sri Lankan government during the conflict in an interview with music magazine Mondomix, stating that China's influence within the UN was preventing prosecutions of war crimes committed during the conflict. Her 2010 music video "Born Free" refilmed the trophy videos of war crimes that were broadcast by Channel 4, with the Tamils substituted for red headed people.

=== Government of South Africa ===
The African National Congress, South Africa's ruling party released a statement in January 2009 calling from an end to the violence and an immediate ceasefire and access to humanitarian aid, expressing increasing alarm that the "continued conflict in Sri Lanka has been cited on the human rights watch international monitoring mechanisms as a conflict now reaching genocidal proportions."

=== Government of Tamil Nadu ===
The leader of the All India Anna Dravida Munnetra Kazhagam party J. Jayalalithaa issued a statement on 27 April 2011 welcoming the report, stating that it confirmed the "human rights violations and brutal repression that was earlier in the realm of speculation or dismissed as biased or partisan reportage". The statement urged the Indian government to take steps to "bring Mahinda Rajapakshe to stand trial for war crimes and genocide along with his generals, senior ministers and all others who were party to the brutal excesses".

In 2009, addressing a public rally in Chennai, Jayalalithaa accused the LTTE of using Tamils as human shields. She said "if LTTE allow the Tamils to go to a safer place, then there will not be any civilian loss". She further said:

"In Sri Lanka what happens now, Sri Lankan Tamils captured by the LTTE cannot move anywhere. Tamils were used as shield by LTTE. If LTTE keeps them there then there will be dire situation for Sri Lanka's innocent Tamils..."

Jayalalithaa was sworn in as the Chief Minister of the southern Indian state of Tamil Nadu on 16 May 2011.

The Tamil Nadu Legislative Assembly passed unanimously a resolution on 8 June 2011 which, based on the report, accused Sri Lanka of: failure in constitutionally resolving the righteous demands of Tamils since independence; working for complete extermination of Tamils in the island; mass killings of innocent Tamils, other atrocities and failure in humanitarian action during the war; continued human rights abuses after the war; and human rights abuses on media persons and others outside of the war zone. The resolution urged the Indian central government to impose economic sanctions against Sri Lanka until Tamils are given equal rights and to press the UN to declare as "war criminals" those who committed alleged war crimes during the conflict in Sri Lanka.

In an official state visit to Chennai, Hillary Clinton discussed the Tamil situation at length with J. Jayalalithaa, contrary to claims beforehand from India's Central Government that the matter would not be broached. Clinton stated that the United States was looking at "creative and innovative ways" to break the impasse over Sri Lanka.

=== Noam Chomsky and Jan Egeland ===
At a 2009 United Nations forum on R2P, the Responsibility to Protect doctrine established by the UN in 2005, Noam Chomsky said:

...What happened in Sri Lanka was a major Rwanda-like atrocity, in a different scale, where the West didn't care. There was plenty of early warning. This [conflict] has been going on for years and decades. Plenty of things could have been done [to prevent it]. But there was not enough interest.

Chomsky was responding to a question that referred to Jan Egeland, former head of the UN's Humanitarian Affairs' earlier statement that R2P was a failure in Sri Lanka.

=== Lord Naseby ===
In 2017, Lord Naseby asked the British Parliament to remove war crimes allegations and said:

...UK must now get the UN and the UNHCR in Geneva to accept a civilian casualty level of 7,000 to 8,000, not 40,000. UK will recognize the truth that no one in the Sri Lankan Government ever wanted to kill Tamil civilians.

He went on to state:

I have discovered an unpublished report from the United Nations country team, which stated that from August 2008 up to 13 May 2009, the number of civilians killed was 7,721. The war ended six days later, so it cannot possibly have got up to 40,000.

However, human rights groups accuse Lord Naseby of purposely distorting a snapshot of figures gathered by the UN in 2009, which contradict the later and more thorough investigation undertaken by the United Nations panel in 2011 which found that as many as 40,000 Tamil civilians may have been killed in the final months of the civil war. In 2014, the Daily Telegraph's chief political commentator Peter Oborne described Lord Naseby as an apologist for the Sri Lankan government, who had given misleading and inaccurate statements about the war, and who had received hospitality from the Sri Lankan government.

=== Human Rights Watch ===
On 30 October 2020, Human Rights Watch criticized the United Nations for aiding the government of Sri Lanka to repair its disgraced image. At a special event held in Sri Lanka to commemorate UN's 75th birthday, the world body honored one of the suspected architects of war crimes in the country.

Mahinda Rajapaksa, the president in power at the time of civil war in the country, attended the UN event as a chief guest.

== See also ==
- Sri Lanka and state terrorism
- Lessons Learnt and Reconciliation Commission
- List of attacks attributed to the LTTE
- List of civilian massacres attributed to Sri Lankan government forces
- Protests against the Sri Lankan civil war
