= Report of the Secretary-General's Panel of Experts on Accountability in Sri Lanka =

2011 UN document outlining a case for war crimes in the Asian country

- Author: UN's Secretary-General's Panel of Experts on Accountability in Sri Lanka
- Language: English
- Subject: History, war, international law, human rights
- Publisher: United Nations
- Publication date: 31 March 2011
- Pages: 214 (inclusive of annexures)

The Report of the Secretary-General's Panel of Experts on Accountability in Sri Lanka was a 2011 report produced by a panel of experts appointed by United Nations Secretary-General (UNSG) Ban Ki-moon to advise him on the issue of accountability with regard to any alleged violations of international human rights and humanitarian law during the final stages of the Sri Lankan Civil War. The report is referred to by some as the Darusman Report, after the name of the chairman of the panel (Indonesian politician Marzuki Darusman).

The panel's work revealed "a very different version of the final stages of the war than that maintained to this day by the Government of Sri Lanka". The panel found "credible allegations" which, if proven, indicated that war crimes and crimes against humanity were committed by the Sri Lankan military and the rebel Liberation Tigers of Tamil Eelam (Tamil Tigers). The panel concluded that "the conduct of the war represented a grave assault on the entire regime of international law designed to protect individual dignity during both war and peace". The panel found that as many as 40,000 civilians may have been killed in the final months of the civil war, most as a result of indiscriminate shelling by the Sri Lankan military. The panel has called on the UNSG to conduct an independent international investigation into the alleged violations of international humanitarian and human rights law committed by both sides. The Sri Lankan government has rejected the entire report, calling it "fundamentally flawed in many respects", and as being based on "patently biased" and unverified material.

A competing report was produced by Sri Lanka's Lessons Learnt and Reconciliation Commission (LLRC). In 2012, the United Nations Human Rights Commission (UNHRC) issued a statement welcoming the publication of this report (while acknowledging problems therein) and urging the Sri Lankan government to follow up by working with the UNHRC. The LLRC report has been praised in Sri Lanka, but criticised by opponents of the island's government.

== Background ==
The final months of the Sri Lankan Civil War resulted in the deaths of thousands of civilians, the displacement of more than 350,000, and allegations of gross violations of international and humanitarian law by both sides. Foreign governments, international human groups and Sri Lankan Tamil diaspora groups all called for an independent investigation. Immediately following the end of the civil war in May 2009, UNSG Ban Ki-moon visited Sri Lanka. At end of the trip the UNSG and Sri Lankan President Mahinda Rajapaksa issued a joint statement in which the Sri Lankan government agreed to take measures on accountability for violations of international humanitarian and human rights law.

In the following months the Sri Lankan government failed to take any meaningful steps on accountability and more evidence emerged of alleged violations during the final months of the civil war. As pressure grew for an international inquiry the UNSG appointed a three-member panel of experts in June 2010 to advise him on accountability issues relating to alleged violations of international human rights and humanitarian law in the final stages of the civil war. The panel looked into "accountability with regard to any alleged violations of international human rights and humanitarian law" and whether the commitment on "human rights accountability" given by Sri Lankan President Mahinda Rajapaksa to Ban Ki-moon has been implemented. The panel examined "the modalities, applicable international standards and comparative experience with regard to accountability processes, taking into account the nature and scope of any alleged violations in Sri Lanka".

The Sri Lankan government reacted angrily to the panel's appointment, calling it "an unwarranted and unnecessary interference with a sovereign nation". It stated that the panel would not be allowed to enter Sri Lanka, a move criticised by Darusman. The panel's appointment was welcomed by the United States and EU but criticised by Russia and China. The panel met for the first time on 19 July 2010.

On 12 April 2011 the panel handed over its report to the Secretary-General who passed on a copy to the Sri Lankan government. The Sri Lankan government immediately rejected the report as "fundamentally flawed" and "patently biased". The report wasn't initially made public but the UN said it would be made public in due course. Human rights called on the UN to make the report public. On 16 April 2011 the report was published in The Island, an independently owned nationalist Sri Lankan newspaper. It had been suggested that the Sri Lankan government leaked the report so that it could issue a full rebuttal before of the report is officially made public by the UN. The Sri Lankan government did not make a formal reply and on 25 April 2011 the UN published the full report.

== Members ==
The members of the panel were:

- Marzuki Darusman, Chair (Indonesia) – Attorney General of Indonesia (1999–2001) and member of its National Commission on Human Rights (Komnas HAM).
- Yasmin Sooka (South Africa) – Judge of the Witwatersrand High Court; commissioner of the South Africa Truth and Reconciliation Commission; the Sierra Leone Truth and Reconciliation Commission; executive director, Foundation for Human Rights of South Africa and trustee of the Desmond Tutu Peace Centre.
- Steven R. Ratner (USA) – Bruno Simma Collegiate Professor of Law at the University of Michigan Law School, member of the U.S. State Department's Advisory Committee on International Law and adviser to Human Rights Watch.

== The report ==
=== Executive summary ===
The evidence obtained by the panel revealed "a very different version of the final stages of the war than that maintained to this day by the Government of Sri Lanka". The panel found "credible allegations, which if proven, indicate that a wide range of serious violations of international humanitarian law and international human rights law were committed both by the Government of Sri Lanka and the LTTE, some of which would amount to war crimes and crimes against humanity". The panel concluded that the "conduct of the war represented a grave assault on the entire regime of international law designed to protect individual dignity during both war and peace".

The panel found "credible allegations" that the Sri Lankan military/government killed civilians through widespread shelling; shelled hospitals and humanitarian objects; denied humanitarian assistance; violated the human rights of civilians and Tamil Tiger combatants; and it violated the human rights of those outside the conflict zone such as the media. The panel found "credible allegations" that the Tamil Tigers used civilians as a human buffer; killed civilians attempting to escape Tamil Tiger control; used military equipment in the proximity of civilians; forcibly recruited children; used forced labour; and killed civilians using suicide attacks.

Specific findings of the panel:

- The Sri Lankan military used large-scale and widespread shelling causing large numbers of civilian deaths. This constituted persecution of the population of the Vanni.
- The Tamil Tigers kept hostage 330,000 civilians who were fleeing the shelling and trapped in an ever-decreasing area.
- The Sri Lankan government tried to intimidate and silence the media and other critics of the war using a variety of threats and actions, including the use of white vans to abduct and to make people disappear.
- The Sri Lankan military shelled on large scale the three Safe Zones where it had encouraged the civilian population to concentrate. It did this even after saying it would cease using heavy weapons.
- The Sri Lankan military shelled the UN hub, food distribution lines and Red Cross ships coming to rescue the wounded and their relatives. It did this despite having intelligence as well as notifications by the UN, Red Cross and others.
- Most of the civilian casualties were caused by Sri Lankan military shelling.
- The Sri Lankan military systematically shelled hospitals on the frontlines. All hospitals in the Vanni were hit by mortars and artillery, sometimes repeatedly, despite the Sri Lankan military knowing their locations.
- The Sri Lankan government systematically deprived civilians in the conflict zone of humanitarian aid, in the form of food and medical supplies, adding to their suffering. The government deliberately underestimated the number of civilians in order to deprive them of humanitarian aid.
- Tens of thousands of civilians were killed between January and May 2009. Many died anonymously in the final days.
- The Sri Lankan government subjected the civilians who managed to escape the conflict zone to further deprivation and suffering.
- Screening for Tamil Tigers took place without any transparency or external scrutiny. Some of those separated by the screening were summarily executed whilst women were raped. Others simply disappeared.
- All IDPs were detained in closed overcrowded camps where they were deprived of their basic rights. The conditions in the camps resulted in many unnecessary deaths.
- There were interrogations and torture in the camps. Suspected Tamil Tigers were taken to other facilities where they faced further abuse.
- The Tamil Tigers refused to allow civilians to leave the conflict zone and kept them as hostages. The civilians were sometimes used as human shields.
- The Tamil Tigers forcibly recruited members during whole civil war but this intensified during the final stages of the war. Some of the recruits were young as 14.
- The Tamil Tigers forced civilians to dig trenches, risking making them look like combatants.
- The Tamil Tigers kept on fighting even when it became clear they had lost in order to save the lives of its leaders. This futile prolonging of the conflict resulted many civilians dying unnecessarily.
- The Tamil Tigers shot at point blank any civilian trying to leave the conflict zone.
- The Tamil Tigers fired artillery from near civilians. They also stored military equipment near civilians and civilian structures such as hospitals.
- The Tamil Tigers carried out suicide attacks against civilians outside the conflict zone even during the final stages of the civil war.

The report states that the "credible allegations" demand a serious investigation and the prosecution of those responsible. If the allegations are proved senior commanders, military and political, on both sides are liable for prosecution under international criminal law. The panel noted the Sri Lankan government's attempt at accountability consisted solely of investigating the actions of the previous government and the Tamil Tigers, and not of the present government's actions during the final stages of the war. The panel concluded this is not in accordance with international standards and fell "dramatically short of international expectations". The panel found the Lessons Learnt and Reconciliation Commission established by the Sri Lankan government to be "deeply flawed" and not up to international standards of independence and impartiality due to the "deep-seated conflicts of interests" of some of its members. The mandate of the LLRC, its work and methodology meant that it was incapable of investigating the serious violations of international humanitarian and human rights law or of examining the causes of the civil war. The panel concluded that the LLRC could not satisfy the commitment on accountability given by President Rajapaksa and Bank Ki-moon.

The panel found that the Sri Lankan justice system was incapable of providing accountability. The independence of the Attorney General had been eroded and the continuation of Emergency Regulations and the Prevention of Terrorism Act precluded the judiciary from holding the government accountable on human rights issues. Military courts and other domestic institutions were also incapable of providing accountability. The panel found that the government's triumphalism and the Sri Lankan Tamil diaspora's inability to acknowledge the Tamil Tigers' role in the humanitarian disaster also hindered accountability.

The panel criticised the UN for not protecting civilians. Its reluctance to release casualty figures undermined the call to protect civilians.

The panel made a number of recommendations, including that there be an independent international investigation into the alleged violations of international law and that the Sri Lankan government carry out genuine investigations of the alleged violations of international humanitarian and human rights law committed by both sides.

=== Civilian death numbers ===
The panel found that even two years after the end of the civil war there were no accurate, reliable figures for the number of civilian deaths during the final months of the civil war. This was caused by lack of accurate figures for the number of civilians and Tamil Tigers in the conflict area, and the number of who emerged from the conflict area; and the burial of dead bodies without deaths being registered.

A UN document estimated that 7,721 civilians were killed between August 2008 and 13 May 2009. The panel found that this figure was probably too low because it only included deaths recorded by UN observers whereas many deaths may not have been observed, and because the figures only go up to 13 May 2009 whereas the number of deaths would have increased sharply after this date to the intensifying of shelling. Many civilians were left where they died, their deaths never registered and their bodies never brought to hospital or buried. The panel concluded that the number of civilian deaths "could easily be several times" that in the UN document.

The panel detailed a couple of techniques that could be used to estimate the death toll. It is estimated that there were 40,000 surgical procedures and 5,000 amputations performed during the final months of the civil war. Using deaths to injuries ratios of 1:2 or 1:3, it is estimated that there were between 15,000 and 22,500 civilian deaths. Another technique subtracted the number of civilians who ended up in the IDP camps (290,000) from the number of civilians in the Safe Zone (330,000) plus those who escaped the conflict zone before the establishment of the Safe Zone (35,000), giving a civilian death total of 75,000.

The panel noted that the UN's decision not to provide specific figures made civilian casualties "less newsworthy". The UN's reluctance may have been due to pressure from the Sri Lankan government and fear of losing access to the conflict area.

The panel found that a number of credible sources have estimated that the number of civilian deaths could have been as much as 40,000. It called for a proper investigation to identify all the victims and to calculate an accurate figure for the total number of civilian deaths.

== Reaction ==
=== Sri Lanka ===
The Sri Lankan government issued a short statement on 13 April 2011 which condemned the report as "fundamentally flawed in many respects" and "patently biased material which is presented without any verification". Later on the government elaborated on its criticisms of the report, which it calls the "Darusman Report". According to the government the report was characterized by "fundamental deficiencies, inherent prejudices and malicious intentions" and that it was "legally, morally and substantively flawed". Later Sri Lankan Government made Lessons Learnt and Reconciliation Commission as an alternative to Darusman report.

The main opposition United National Party has echoed the prevailing critical note in Sri Lanka, calling the report an "unwarranted interference", but it has blamed the government for creating "an environment that gave space for the compilation of such a report". The UNP has called the government to implement some of the report's recommendations, such as scrapping emergency laws, relaxing the Prevention of Terrorism Act and issuing death certificates to those who disappeared during the civil war.

The Tamil National Alliance, the largest political party representing the Sri Lankan Tamils, issued a statement on 18 April 2011 welcoming the report and its findings, stating that the report "confirms the truth of what happened to the unarmed Tamil civilians in the course of the conduct of the recently concluded war and is an irrefutable confirmation of the accounts of the events as reported by us to Parliament as and when they occurred". The statement welcomed the reports recommendations and hoped that "they will be honestly implemented". The statement noted the panel's observation that at present there wasn't "an environment conducive to accountability which would permit a candid appraisal of the broad patterns of the past, including the root causes of the long-running ethno-nationalist conflict". The statement urged the Sri Lankan government "not to miss this opportunity and to constructively engage in a process which would result in all the Peoples of Sri Lanka being the beneficiaries of genuine democracy, equality and justice". The TNA's reaction to the report has led to a backlash against it by Sri Lankan nationalists.

=== India ===
In a press release dated 26 April 2011 the official spokesperson for the Indian Ministry of External Affairs stated that the issues raised by the report need to be studied carefully and that the Indian government would "engage with the Government of Sri Lanka on the issues contained in the Report".

The leader of the All India Anna Dravida Munnetra Kazhagam party J. Jayalalithaa issued a statement on 27 April 2011 welcoming the report, stating that it confirmed the "human rights violations and brutal repression that was earlier in the realm of speculation or dismissed as biased or partisan reportage". The statement urged the Indian government to take steps to "bring Mahinda Rajapakshe to stand trial for war crimes and genocide along with his generals, senior ministers and all others who were party to the brutal excesses". Jayalalitha was sworn in as the Chief Minister of the southern Indian state of Tamil Nadu on 16 May 2011.

The Tamil Nadu Legislative Assembly passed unanimously a resolution on 8 June 2011 which, based on the report, accused Sri Lanka of: failure in constitutionally resolving the righteous demands of Tamils since independence; working for complete extermination of Tamils in the island; mass killings of innocent Tamils, other atrocities and failure in humanitarian action during the war; continued human rights abuses after the war; and human rights abuses on media persons and others outside of the war zone. The resolution urged the Indian central government to impose economic sanctions against Sri Lanka until Tamils are given equal rights and to press the UN to declare as "war criminals" those who committed alleged war crimes during the conflict in Sri Lanka.

=== International ===
United States – The US Permanent Representative to the United Nations Susan Rice issued a statement on 25 April 2011 on behalf of the US government welcoming the report and its full publication. The statement went on to say "The report highlights the need for an independent and full accounting of the facts in order to ensure that allegations of abuse are addressed and impunity for human rights violations is avoided. We strongly support the Secretary General’s call for the Sri Lankan authorities to respond constructively to the report and underscore our belief that accountability and reconciliation are inextricably linked".

China – At a press conference on 30 April 2011 Chinese Foreign Ministry spokesperson Hong Lei stated that the Sri Lankan government should be allowed to handle the issues raised in the report. Lei urged the international community to support the Sri Lankan government's efforts and not to take any action that would "complicate the issue".

European Union – The High Representative of the Union for Foreign Affairs and Security Policy Catherine Ashton issued a statement on 10 May 2011 on behalf of the European Union welcoming the report, calling it "an important development". The statement went on to say "that an independent process to address these extremely serious allegations should contribute to strengthening the process of reconciliation and ensuring lasting peace and security in Sri Lanka". The statement urged the Sri Lankan government to "recognise the constructive objectives of the report, and...engage with the UNSG on its contents".

On 12 May 2011 the European Parliament passed resolution P7 TA(2011)0242 in which it expressed "concern at the serious nature of the allegations in the UN report" and acknowledged the panel's findings. The resolution took the view that "the allegations contained in the UN panel of experts' report warrant a full, impartial and transparent investigation". The resolution urged the Sri Lankan government to implement the panel's recommendations and "to commence genuine investigations into the violations of international humanitarian and human rights law allegedly committed by both sides".

United Kingdom – The Foreign and Commonwealth Office issued a statement on 27 April 2011 supporting the establishment of the panel of experts and welcoming the report. The statement went on to say "The serious nature of the allegations in the report...and the issue of accountability for them, must be resolved before lasting reconciliation can be achieved in Sri Lanka".

=== Human rights groups ===
UN High Commissioner for Human Rights Navi Pillay issued a statement on 26 April 2011 welcoming the publication of the report and supporting the report's call for further international investigation. The statement went on to say "The way this conflict was conducted, under the guise of fighting terrorism, challenged the very foundations of the rules of war and cost the lives of tens of thousands of civilians...I hope the disturbing new information contained in this report will shock the conscience of the international community into finally taking serious action...this report demand a full, impartial, independent and transparent investigation...Unless there is a sea-change in the Government’s response, which has so far been one of total denial and blanket impunity, a full-fledged international inquiry will clearly be needed".

Amnesty International has called for international accountability for those responsible for the war crimes alleged in the report, stating that the "UN report finally exposes the Sri Lankan government’s whitewash in its efforts to deny justice to the war’s victims". AI has urged the UNSG to ensure that the UN establishes "a commission of inquiry to collect evidence on the alleged crimes by both sides, to determine who did what to whom, and to recommend next steps for bringing suspected perpetrators to justice in a transparent and timely manner".

Human Rights Watch has stated that the panel's findings that both sides committed abuses and that the Sri Lankan government has failed to hold its forces accountable showed the need for an international investigation. HRW has urged the UNSG to implement the panel's recommendation to establish an international independent investigation. It has also urged Russia and China "to stop blocking efforts to find justice for victims in Sri Lanka and support the panel's recommendations".

Eleven international human rights groups sent a joint letter to United States Secretary of State Hillary Clinton on 27 May 2011 urging the US government to use the 17th session of the United Nations Human Rights Council to press for international accountability for war crimes in Sri Lanka, welcome the expert panel's report, express concern at its findings and call for "full implementation" of the panel's recommendations.

== See also ==
- Lessons Learnt and Reconciliation Commission
- United Nations Fact Finding Mission on the Gaza Conflict
