= Eleiko =

Swedish fitness equipment manufacturer

- Type: Private, Aktiebolag
- Industry: Fitness and health
- Founded: 1927; 99 years ago in Halmstad, Sweden
- Headquarters: Halmstad, Sweden
- Area served: Global
- Key people: Erik Blomberg (CEO); Magnus Welander (chairman); Magnus Nyberg (President, US)
- Products: Barbells; Weight plates; Clothing; Other weightlifting equipment; Household appliances (formerly)
- Owner: Gunnila Blomberg
- Number of employees: ~220 (2024)
- Website: eleiko.com

Eleiko is a Swedish manufacturer of exercise equipment. Known primarily for their weightlifting equipment such as barbells and weight plates, the company has been selected as the equipment provider for several weightlifting competitions such as the Olympics and International Weightlifting Federation-sanctioned events.

== History ==
Eleiko was founded in 1927 in Halmstad as a manufacturer of electrical household appliances, primarily producing items like waffle irons and toasters.

A major turning point in the company's history came in 1957, when a factory supervisor and avid weightlifter, Hällström, proposed developing a more durable barbell to address the common problem of bars bending or breaking during use. Using high-quality Swedish steel and new manufacturing techniques, Eleiko produced its first barbell, marking its entry into the strength equipment industry.

Eleiko's barbell gained international recognition at the 1963 World Weightlifting Championships in Stockholm, where it was the first bar to complete an entire competition without failing. This success established the company's reputation for durability and precision and helped position Eleiko as a leader in weightlifting equipment.

In the years that followed, Eleiko continued to innovate, introducing rubber-coated weight plates and refining its manufacturing processes. By 1969, the company became the first to receive certification from the International Weightlifting Federation (IWF), further solidifying its standing in international competition. During the 1980s, Eleiko expanded into powerlifting and became an official supplier to the International Powerlifting Federation (IPF). Its equipment has since been used in numerous major competitions, including the Olympic Games, Paralympic Games, and World Championships.

In 2021, Eleiko expanded its global footprint by relocating its North American headquarters from Chicago to Austin. The new U.S. headquarters was established as a combined office, warehouse, and training facility, significantly increasing logistics capacity and enabling faster distribution across North America. The site also includes a dedicated sport center designed to host educational programs, workshops, and training for athletes.

Over time, Eleiko evolved from a specialized barbell manufacturer into a global provider of strength training equipment, including free weights, racks, and platforms. The company remains headquartered in Halmstad and continues to emphasize precision engineering, craftsmanship, and innovation in strength sports

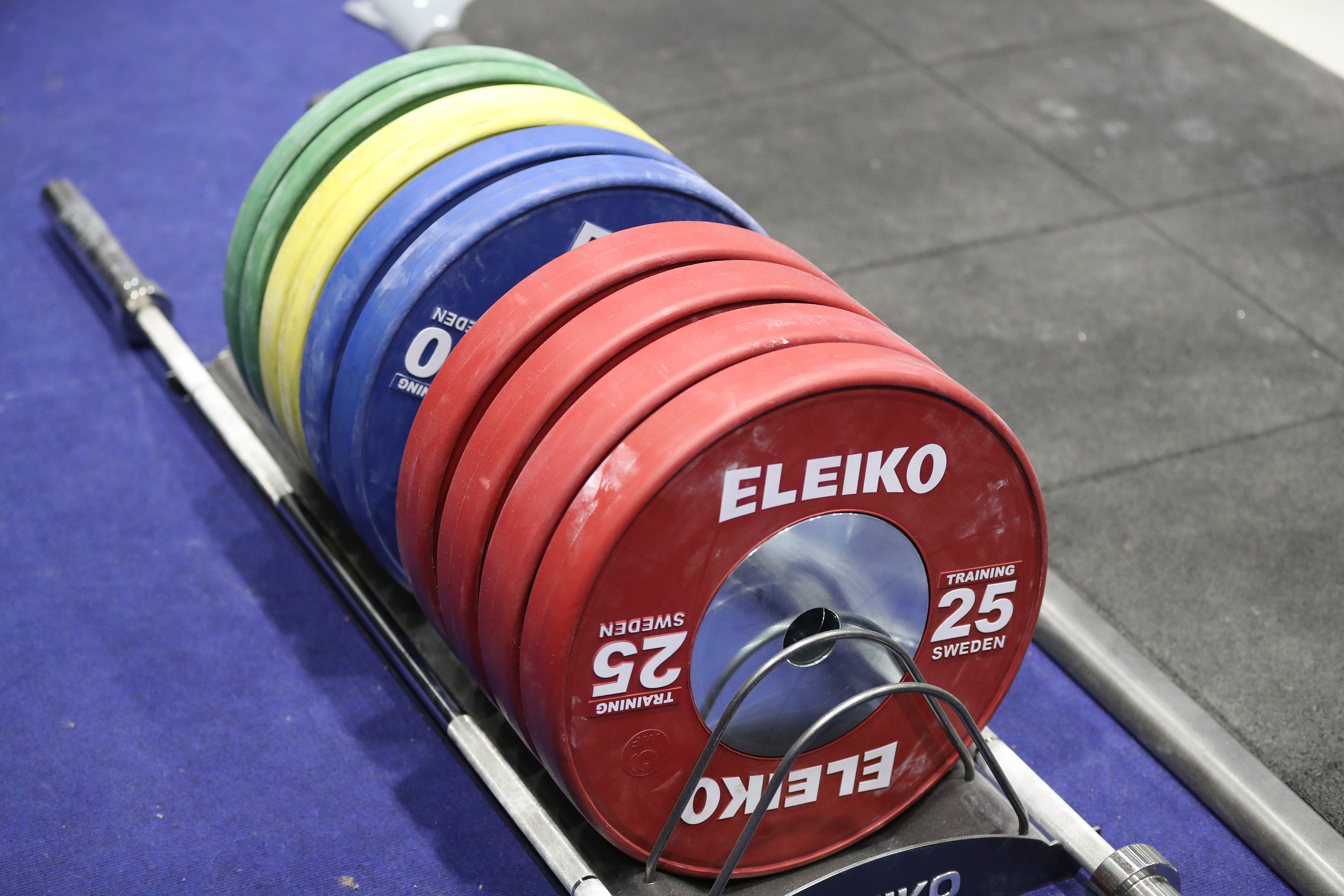
Eleiko's Olympic weightlifting plates.

== Products ==
=== Barbells ===
Eleiko's barbells are regarded as the best in the industry and are offered in several variants. The company offers barbells for Olympic weightlifting, powerlifting, and regular weightlifting. Barbells differ in their knurling and weight; the barbells can be differentiated by markings within the sleeve which are visible from a side-on view. Both competition and training weightlifting barbells are International Weightlifting Federation certified, alongside a lifetime warranty for their competition barbells. Relative to other brands, Eleiko weightlifting bars are also the least stiff; they have more whip than other brands as a result.

=== Plates ===
Alongside barbells, Eleiko also sells weight plates. Eleiko's plate color configuration also had significant influence on the IWF's efforts to standardize plate colors; with Eleiko's red, blue, yellow, green and white palette becoming the IWF's official color scheme. Eleiko produces plates for professional weightlifting, professional powerlifting, and strength training.

=== Prestera ===
Eleiko Prestera is a modular strength training system developed by Eleiko that integrates racks, rigs, cables, attachments, and storage into a single, unified system. Designed with a “lifter-first” philosophy, Prestera emphasizes precise geometry, durability, and adaptability, allowing facilities to create highly efficient and customizable training environments. Its modular design enables seamless integration of barbell training, free weights, and functional fitness elements, making it suitable for everything from elite performance centers to compact training spaces. Engineered using high-quality materials and refined manufacturing processes, Prestera prioritizes safety, performance, and long-term reliability while offering scalable configurations that can evolve alongside the needs of athletes and coaches.

=== Platforms ===
The Eleiko SVR (Sound and Vibration Reduction) platform is a line of lifting platforms designed to reduce the noise and vibration generated when barbells are dropped during training. Independent testing has shown that SVR platforms reduce sound levels by an average of 25.7 decibels (dB) compared with a baseline scenario. SVR technology uses a multi‑layer construction and engineered materials to absorb impact and vibration, making heavy barbell work more viable in spaces where sound transmission is a concern.
