= Biceps curl =

Biceps exercise

Biceps curls are a group of weight training exercises in which a person bends their arm towards their body at the elbow in order to make their biceps stronger, increase the biceps muscle size, or both.

== Overview ==
The biceps curl mainly targets the biceps brachii, brachialis and brachioradialis muscles. The biceps are stronger at elbow flexion when the forearm is supinated (palms turned upward) and weaker when the forearm is pronated. The brachioradialis is at its most effective when the palms are facing inward, and the brachialis is unaffected by forearm rotation. Therefore, the degree of forearm rotation affects the degree of muscle recruitment between the three muscles.

=== Form ===
Close grip EZ barbell curl

Typically, a biceps curl begins with the arm fully extended with a supinated (palms facing up) grip on a weight. A full repetition consists of bending or "curling" the elbow until it is fully flexed, then slowly lowering the weight to the starting position. The torso should remain upright instead of swinging back and forth, as doing so transfers the load away from the biceps and onto other muscles, reducing the effectiveness of the exercise. The elbows are also usually kept stationary at the side of the torso, as allowing the elbows to move in front of the weight's center of gravity removes tension on the biceps before full contraction is achieved.

To maximize the activation of biceps, conducting this exercise using the full range of motion is generally recommended. But for advanced trainers, they can apply a different variation of range in order to acquire some particular emphasis muscle activation. Some may argue that the tension on muscle is most significant during the mid-range, practice biceps curl with a half range of motion to let muscle generate the most force.

The research found that the preacher curl targets the long head of the biceps significantly only when the arm was almost fully extended, and the range of motion was short. On the other hand, the incline dumbbell curl and the regular biceps curl activated the biceps throughout the entire range of motion. They may be more effective in maximizing the biceps activation.

== Types ==
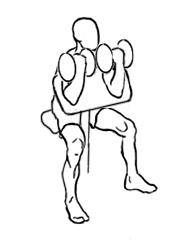
Dumbbell Preacher Curl

There are several types of biceps curls that use varying equipment, forms, and volume. But the general idea is still to target the biceps activation. Below are some typical variations using common equipment that are prevalent among trainers.

=== Dumbbells ===
- Dumbbell incline curl: With an adjustable utility bench positioned at a 45-degree angle, one could perform incline biceps curls with dumbbells. Incline biceps curls are usually performed with lighter weight compare to regular biceps curls, and by sitting on the incline bench, holding the dumbbells close to the body with elbows tucked in, then performing a full curl.
- Supine dumbbell curl: To lay down supinely on a flat bench, with a dumbbell in each hand using the neutral grip (two palms facing each other). And hang down both arm until enough tension is imposed on the shoulder. Simultaneously raise the dumbbells while supinating the wrists until biceps are fully contracted. Then drop the dumbbells to the initial position for another repetition.
- Dumbbell reverse curl: Pronate both wrists into a shoulder-width reverse grip and grip the dumbbells in a standing position. Keep elbows stationary and curl the dumbbells towards shoulder until the biceps are fully contracted. Then drop the weight back to the starting position for another repetition. The reverse curl targets more of the forearm muscles rather than the biceps themselves

Barbell Reverse Curl

=== Barbells ===
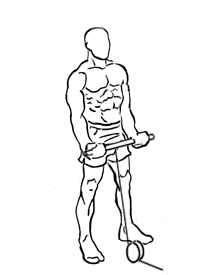
Cable Curl

- Barbell preacher curl: Sit on a preacher bench and adjust the seat height to an optimal position. Keep the back of upper arms tightly attached to the preacher bench with a barbell hold by both hands. Flex the elbows until they are almost fully extended and curl the barbell towards shoulder until the biceps are fully contracted. Then return the barbell to the initial position for another repetition.
- Barbell reverse curl: Hold the barbell in a standing position with a shoulder-width reverse grip. Tuck the elbows to the side of the torso and keep the scapula pressed, so the shoulders remain stable. Drive the barbell towards the shoulder until the biceps are fully contracted. Then return the barbell to starting position for another repetition. Like its dumbbell variation, it targets more of the forearms rather than the biceps.
- Prone incline barbell curl: This variation is also known as the "spider curl" Trainers first need to lay down on an incline bench face towards the floor. Then holds a barbell with a shoulder-width supinated grip. Drive the barbell up while keeping the upper arms fixed to maintain the elbow position. Squeeze biceps to maximize contraction, then drop the barbell to the starting position for another repetition.
- Drag curl: Hold the barbell with shoulder-width underhand grip in a standing position. In this variation, the elbow doesn't need to be fixed. Instead, elbow flexion is the fundamental idea. Drive the barbell vertically up towards shoulder while elbows travel back as elbow flex. Then drive elbows forward when the forearms are beyond the chest. Raise the forearms until they are perpendicular to the torso, then drop the barbell back to the starting position for another repetition.

Dumbbells isolate muscles and allow wider range of motion.

On the other hand, barbells stabilize the body and allow for heavier loading.

The choice between the two boils down to following key considerations:

- Upper arm workout goals: isolation (dumbbells) or stability/strength (barbells).
- Workout Variety for balanced arm development.
- Experience, comfort level and personal preference.

==== Advantages of dumbbells ====
- Prioritize isolation and a full range of motion.
- Address muscle imbalances between the arms.
- Target muscles from different angles.
- Focus on muscle definition and overall arm aesthetics.

==== Advantages of barbells ====
- Gain more stability and control.
- Build strength and progressively lift heavier weights.
- Start simple and prefer working with one piece of equipment.
- Balance muscle development and symmetry.

=== Cable machine ===
- Overhead cable curl: Stand in the middle of a cable machine with two pulleys in shoulder-height level, grasp a stirrup handle in each hand. Raise both upper arms parallel with shoulders, and supinate the forearms to let the palms facing the torso. Drive the stirrups inwards until biceps are fully contracted, then return the stirrups to starting position for another repetition.
- Cable curl: Hold the bar that is attached to a pulley at the lowest level in a standing position, step a foot back from the pulley to create a comfortable angle for this exercise. Raise the bar toward the shoulder until the biceps are fully tightened, maintaining the elbows at the side of the body and the shoulders fixed. Return the bar back to the initial position for another repetition.
- Lying high cable curl: Lie prone on a bench that is under a cable machine with pulley at the highest level. Grasp a bar that is attached to the pulley with a shoulder-width grip, and fully extend to elbows. Keep the upper arms fixed and curl the bar towards the forehead until the elbow is fully flexed. Then return the bar to starting position for another repetition.

=== Body weight ===
- Body weight curl: Grip under a bar, rings or suspension trainer whilst using a supinated grip and place your feet on the floor. Now curl your neck towards the bar, ring or suspension trainer whilst performing forearm flexion. The position of the feet can be manipulated to change the difficulty of the exercise.

== Injuries ==
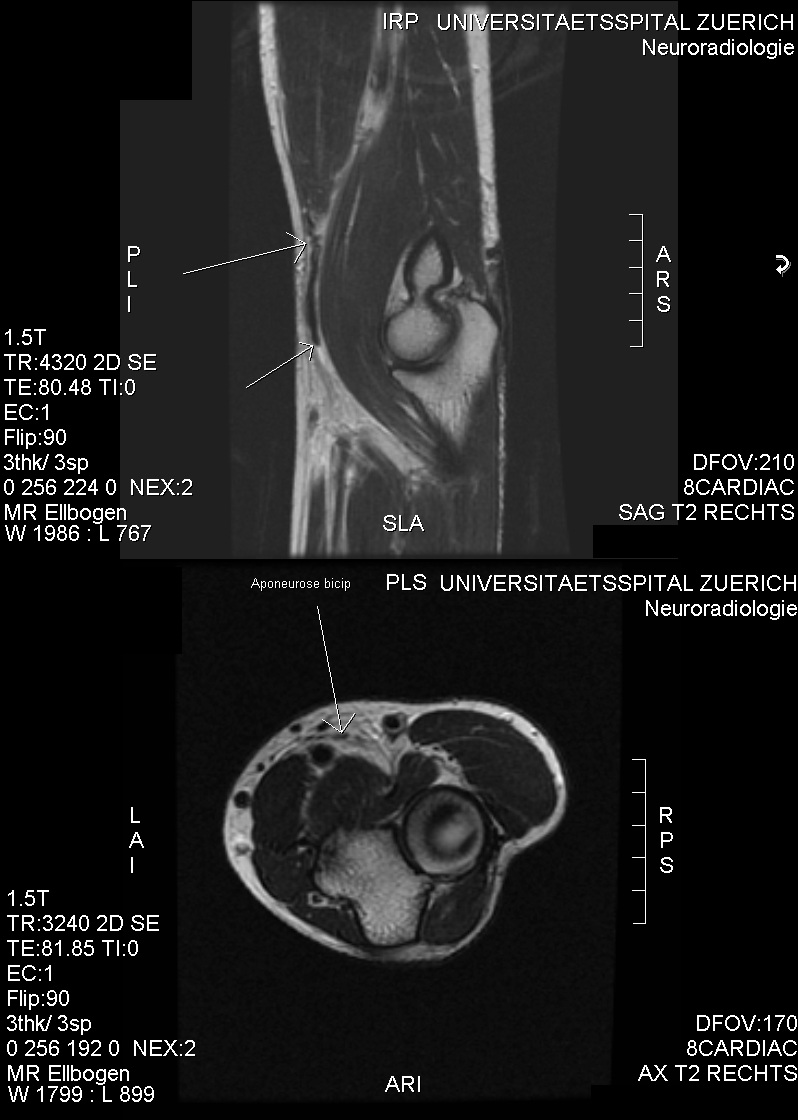
MRI: tear of the distal biceps tendon

Injuries can occur due to careless mistakes or incorrect form, often caused by "ego lifting". The most common injury caused by biceps curls is a tear of the biceps tendon. There are two main causes of biceps tendon tears: excessive weight and overuse. Ego lifting is an attempt to lift weights that are heavier than the weightlifter's capability. During ego lifting, the lifter's form will be twisted because the weight is too heavy, and if the weight is far beyond the lifter's strength, there is an increased risk of biceps tears.

Another injury caused by biceps curls is ulnar neuropathy, which leads to ulnar nerve conduction slowing at the elbow. This is caused by compression of the nerves against a weight bench during the exercise. Though unlikely, biceps curls can cause a rupture of the pectoralis major muscle, which is a severe injury that occurs in the chest.
