= Internal wrenching nut =

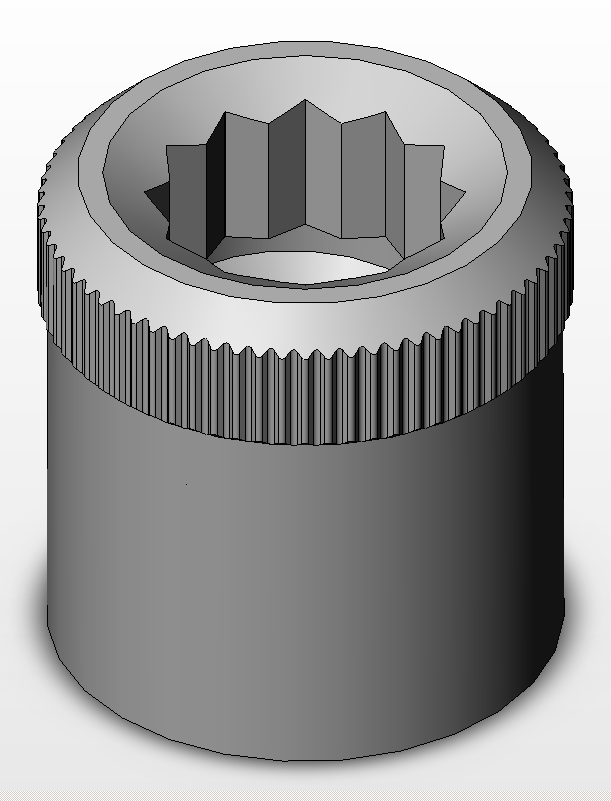
Internal wrenching nut

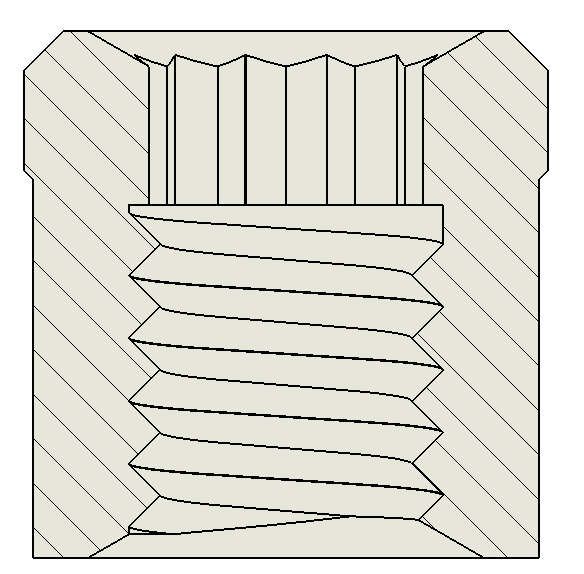
Cut-away view of an internal wrenching nut

An internal wrenching nut (also known as an Allenut or Allen nut) is a cylindrical nut that is internally threaded on one side and has an Allen socket on the other side; the outside of the nut is smooth or has knurling on it.

The Allen socket may be 6 point or 12 point, also known as a double hex socket. They are used where hex or square nuts do not fit.
