= Olympic weightlifting =

Sport

Weightlifting
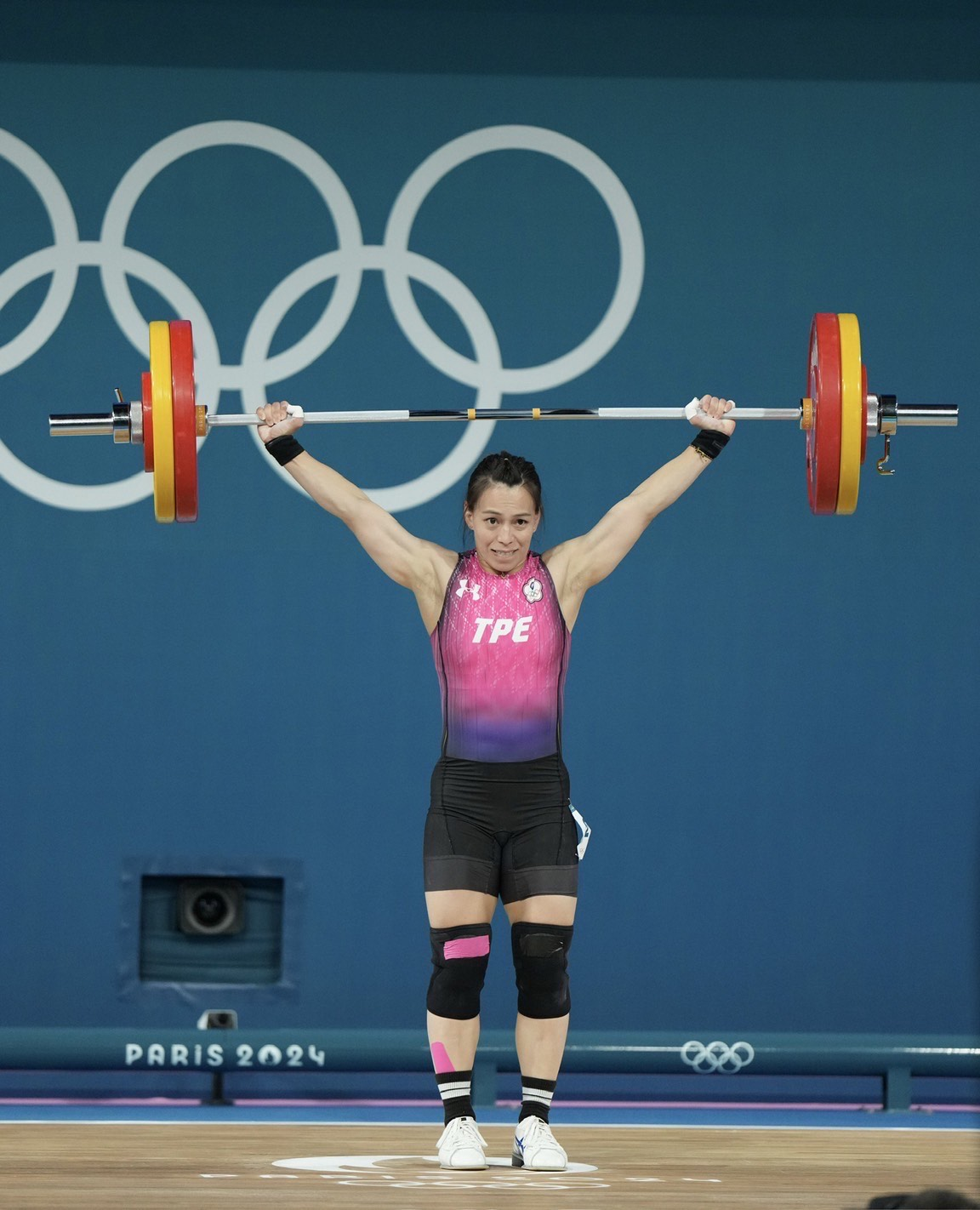
- Olympic weightlifter Kuo Hsing-chun lifting 105 kg at the 2024 Olympic Games in Paris, France
- Highest governing body: International Weightlifting Federation
- First developed: Ancient Greece

Characteristics
- Contact: No
- Mixed-sex: No
- Type: Power sport
- Equipment: Barbells, weight plates, collars, chalk, tape, heel-elevated shoes, belt, knee sleeves, wrist wraps

Presence
- Country or region: Worldwide
- Olympic: Men: 1896, 1904, 1920–present; Women: 2000–present
- World Games: Women: 1997

Pictogram for Weightlifting at the Summer Olympics

Weightlifting (often known as Olympic weightlifting) is a competitive strength sport in which athletes compete in lifting a barbell loaded with weight plates from the ground to overhead, with the aim of successfully lifting the heaviest weights. Athletes compete in two specific ways of lifting the barbell overhead. The snatch is a wide-grip lift, in which the weighted barbell is lifted overhead in one motion. The clean and jerk is a combination lift, in which the weight is first taken from the ground to the front of the shoulders (the clean), and then from the shoulders to over the head (the jerk). The sport formerly included a third lift/event known as clean and press.

Each weightlifter gets three attempts at both the snatch and the clean and jerk, with the snatch attempted first. An athlete's score is the combined total of the highest successfully-lifted weight in kilograms for each lift. Athletes compete in various weight classes, which are different for each sex and have changed over time.

Weightlifting is an Olympic sport, and has been contested in every Summer Olympic Games since 1920. While the sport is officially named "weightlifting", the terms "Olympic weightlifting" and "Olympic-style weightlifting" are often used to distinguish it from the other sports and events that involve the lifting of weights, such as powerlifting, weight training, and strongman events. Similarly, the snatch and the clean and jerk are known as the "Olympic lifts".

While other strength sports test limit of strength, Olympic-style weightlifting also tests limits of human power (explosive strength): the Olympic lifts are executed faster, and require more mobility and a greater range of motion during their execution, than other barbell lifts. The Olympic lifts, and their variations (e.g., power snatch, power clean) as well as components of the Olympic lifts (e.g., cleans, squats) are used by elite athletes in other sports to train for both explosive strength (power) and functional strength.

== Competition ==
The sport is competed at local, national, and international levels. The sport is governed internationally by the International Weightlifting Federation (IWF), which runs the World Weightlifting Championships each year.

=== Component lifts ===
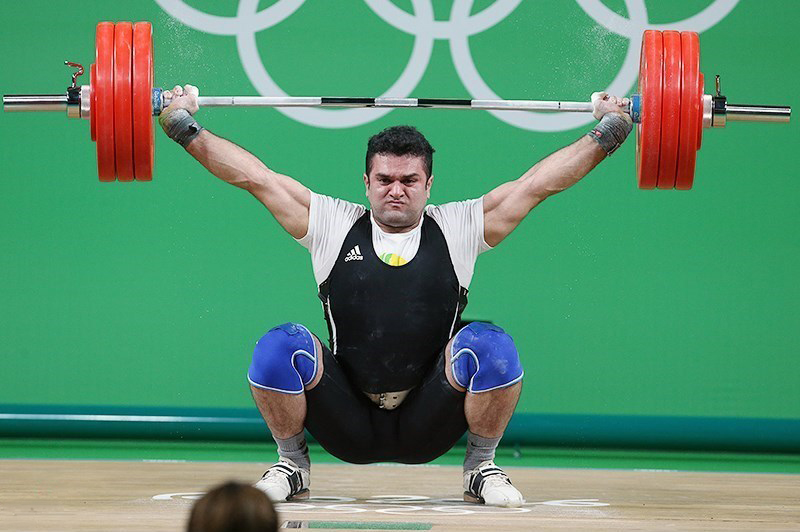
Mohammad Reza Barari, an Iranian lifter, snatching at the 2016 Olympic Games in Rio, Brazil

The snatch is a lift wherein an athlete sweeps the barbell up and overhead in one fluid action: the lifter takes a wide-grip on the bar and pulls the barbell off the floor before rapidly re-bending their knees to get themself under the barbell (usually bringing themself into a deep overhead squat position), so that the barbell is supported over their head with arms outstretched. The snatch is then completed by the lifter rising to a standing position while holding the barbell overhead. The snatch demands precise balance.

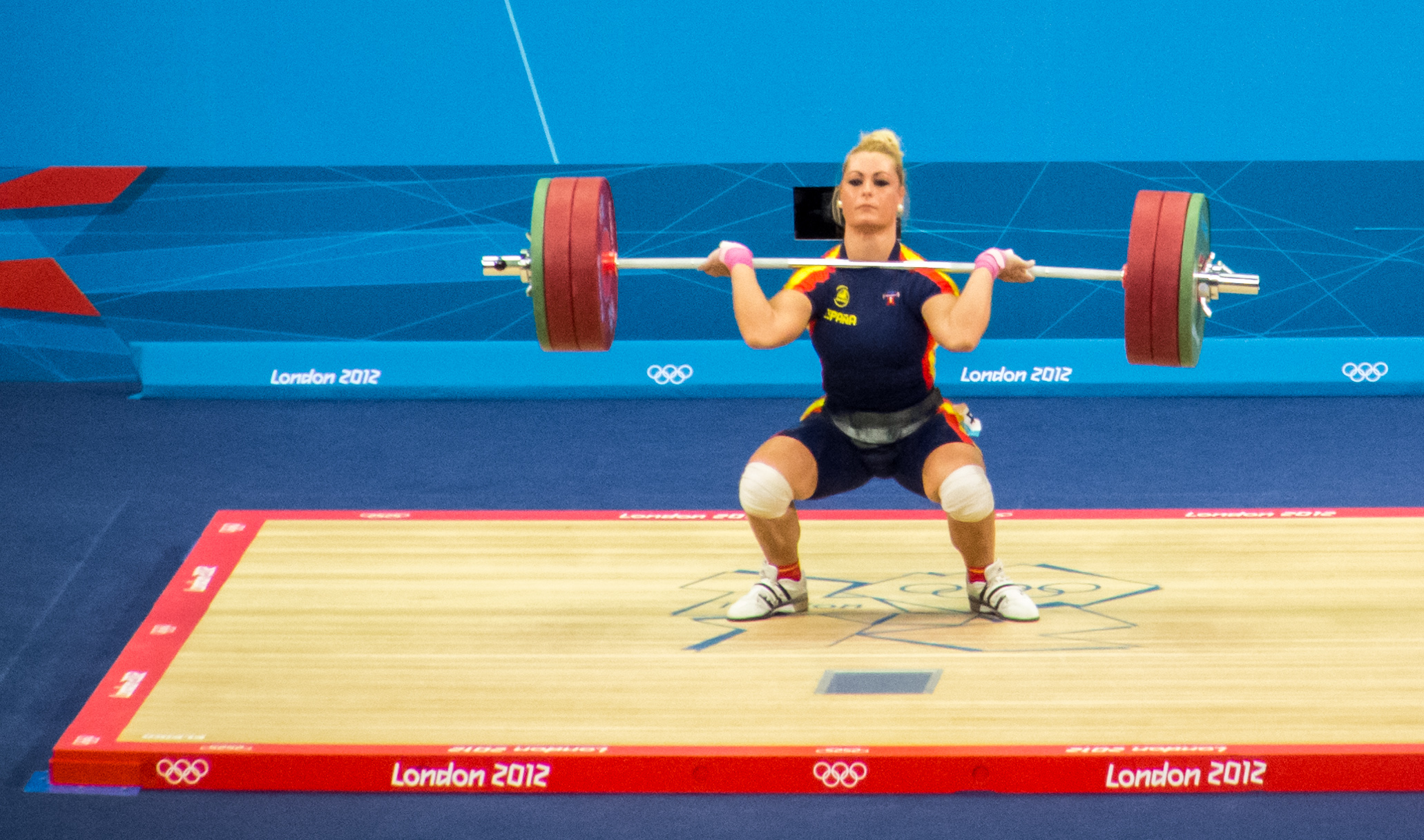
Lidia Valentín of Spain performing a clean at the 2012 Olympic Games in London

The clean and jerk is a combination lift, in which the athlete gets the barbell overhead in two stages: first by lifting the barbell into support on the front of the shoulders, a position known as the front rack (the clean), and then lifting it from shoulders to overhead (the jerk). To perform the clean, the lifter takes a shoulder-width grip on the bar and pulls it off the floor, and then rapidly re-bends their knees (and bends their arms) to get their body under the barbell and "catch" the bar on the front of the shoulders (usually in a deep front squat position). The lifter finishes the clean by rising to a standing position while holding the barbell on the front of their shoulders. The lifter then uses the jerk to jump into a bent knees position (most commonly with one foot forward and the other back, a technique known as the split jerk) while pumping the barbell overhead. The jerk is completed when the lifter re-straightens the legs (bringing them together after a split jerk) so they come to a straight standing position with the barbell held overhead.

A third lift, the clean and press, was also a competition lift from 1924 through 1972. It entails a clean followed by an overhead press. The overhead press is distinguished from the jerk, in that jerking movements, bending of the legs, and displacement of the feet are prohibited. It was discontinued after 1972 due to difficulties in judging proper form.

=== Weight classes ===
Athletes compete in a division determined by their body mass. These are the new International Weightlifting Federation (IWF) weight classes, which effect since August 1, 2026:

Current Weight Classes:

IWF Men's weight classes

- 60 kg
- 65 kg *
- 70 kg
- 75 kg *
- 85 kg *
- 95 kg *
- 110 kg *
- +110 kg *

* indicates weight classes that will be contested at the 2028 Olympics in Los Angeles:

IWF Women's weight classes

- 49 kg
- 53 kg *
- 57 kg
- 61 kg *
- 69 kg *
- 77 kg *
- 86 kg *
- +86 kg *

* indicates weight classes that will be contested at the 2028 Olympics in Los Angeles:

Former Weight Classes:

From June 1, 2025 through August 1, 2026, the IWF used the following weight classes:

IWF Former Men's weight classes (2025–2026):

- 60 kg
- 65 kg
- 71 kg
- 79 kg
- 88 kg
- 94 kg
- 110 kg
- +110 kg

IWF Former Women's weight classes (2025–2026):

- 48 kg
- 53 kg
- 58 kg
- 63 kg
- 69 kg
- 77 kg
- 86 kg
- +86 kg

From 2018 to 2025 the IWF had 10 weight classes, 7 of which were contested at the 2020 Summer Olympics.

IWF Former Men's weight classes (2018–2025):

Categories

- 55 kg (121 lb)
- 61 kg (134 lb)
- 67 kg (148 lb)
- 73 kg (161 lb)
- 81 kg (179 lb)
- 89 kg (196 lb)
- 96 kg (212 lb)
- 102 kg (225 lb)
- 109 kg (240 lb)
- 109 kg and over (240 lb+)

Only five weight classes were chosen for Paris 2024:

- 61 kg, 73 kg, 89 kg, 102 kg and over 102 kg.

IWF Former Women's weight classes (2018–2025):

Categories

- 45 kg (99 lb)
- 49 kg (108 lb)
- 55 kg (121 lb)
- 59 kg (130 lb)
- 64 kg (141 lb)
- 71 kg (157 lb)
- 76 kg (168 lb)
- 81 kg (179 lb)
- 87 kg (192 lb)
- 87 kg and over (192 lb+)

Weight classes chosen for Paris 2024:

- 49 kg, 59 kg, 71 kg, 81 kg and over 81 kg.

=== Official procedure ===
In each weight division, lifters compete in both the snatch and the clean and jerk. Prizes are usually given for the heaviest weights lifted in each and in the overall—the maximum lifts of both added. The order of the competition is up to the lifters—the competitor who chooses to attempt the lowest weight goes first. If they are unsuccessful at that weight, they have the option of reattempting at that weight or trying a heavier weight after any other competitors have made attempts at the previous weight or any other intermediate weights. The barbell is loaded incrementally and progresses to a heavier weight throughout the course of competition. Weights are set in 1-kilogram increments. If two athletes lift the same weight, they are both credited with it, but in terms of placing, the one who lifted the weight first gets the highest placing.

During competition, the snatch event takes place first, followed by a short intermission, and then the clean and jerk event. There are two side judges and one head referee who together provide a "successful" or "failed" result for each attempt based on their observation of the lift within the governing body's rules and regulations. Two successes are required for any attempt to pass. Usually, the judges' and referee's results are registered via a lighting system, with a white light indicating a "successful" lift and a red light indicating a "failed" lift. This is done for the benefit of all in attendance, be they athlete, coach, administrator, or audience. In addition, one or two technical officials may be present to advise during a ruling.

Lifters who fail to successfully complete at least one snatch and at least one clean and jerk fail to total, and receive an "incomplete" entry for the competition.

=== Local competition rules ===
At local competitions, a "Best Lifter" title is commonly awarded. It is awarded to both the best men's and women's lifters. The award is based on a formula which employs the "Sinclair coefficient", a coefficient derived and approved by the sport's world governing body, which allows for differences in both gender and bodyweight. When the formula is applied to each lifter's overall total and then grouped along with the other competitors' and evaluated, it provides a numeric result which determines the competition's best overall men's and women's lifters. And while, usually, the winner of the heaviest weight class will have lifted the most overall weight during the course of a competition, a lifter in a lighter weight class may still have lifted more weight both relative to their own bodyweight, and to the Sinclair coefficient formula, thereby garnering the "Best Lifter" award.

== History ==
Competitions to establish who can lift the heaviest weight have been recorded throughout civilization, with the earliest known recordings including those found in Egypt, China, India, and Ancient Greece.

=== Early international competitions ===
The international sport of weightlifting began with the First World Weightlifting Championships in 1891, in London, with Edward Lawrence Levy becoming the first world champion.

In 1896, the inaugural Olympic Games in Athens included weightlifting in the field event (the predecessor to today's track and field or athletics event). In the early Olympic Games, a distinction was drawn between lifting with 'one hand' only and lifting with 'two hands', and all competitors competed together regardless of their size and weight. The winner of the 'one hand' competition in 1896 was Launceston Elliot of Scotland, while the winner of the 'two hands' event was Viggo Jensen of Denmark.

Further World Weightlifting Championships followed in 1898 in Austria, 1899 in Milan, and 1903 in Paris, with the International Weightlifting Federation being founded in 1905.

Weightlifting was next contested at the Olympics in the 1904 Games (again in athletics), and at the 1906 Intercalated Games, but was omitted from the Games of 1900, 1908 and 1912 (1912 being the last Games until after the First World War).

=== Olympic Games 1920–1972 ===
In 1920, weightlifting returned to the Olympics and, for the first time, as an event in its own right – and weightlifting has been contested at every (summer) Olympics Games since. The 1920 Games took place at Antwerp in Belgium; and fourteen nations competed. The competition lifts were the 'one hand' snatch, the 'one hand' clean and jerk and the 'two hands' clean and jerk. At the next Olympic Games, in Paris, in 1924, the 'two hands' press and the 'two hands' snatch were added to the program, making a total of five lifts; and weight classes were introduced for competitors, with weightlifters competing in five weight divisions.

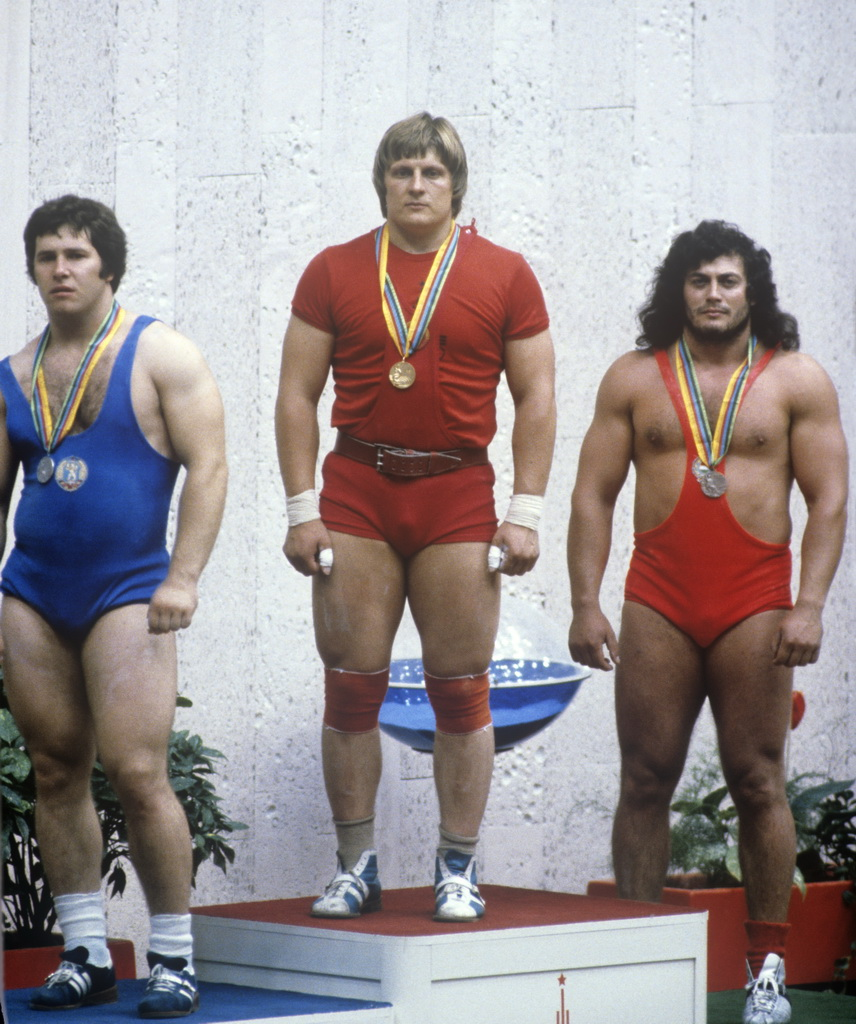
The 110 kg division weightlifting winners at the 1980 Summer Olympics, held in Moscow

In 1928, the sport dropped the 'one hand' exercises, going forward with three 'two hand' exercises: the snatch, the clean and press, and the clean and jerk.

The 1972 Olympics was the last Olympics featuring the clean and press, as difficulties in judging proper form led to it being dropped from subsequent competitions. Athletes, rather than "strictly" pressing the weight overhead with an upright torso, had been using their hips and leaning backward substantially. Some athletes were able to initiate the press with a hip thrust so rapid that judges found it difficult to determine whether or not they had utilized any knee bend to generate additional force, something strictly prohibited in the rules. Also prohibited was "excessive layback" (leaning back too much), but it was considered too difficult to determine what degree of layback constituted a rule violation. As a result, the clean and press was discontinued as a competition lift after 1972.

=== 1973–present ===
Since the 1973 World Weightlifting Championships, weightlifting competitions have been biathlons of the snatch and the clean and jerk, with the 1976 Olympics being the first Olympics in this format.

=== Women's weightlifting ===
In 1987, women's world championship events were included for the first time in IWF's annual World Weightlifting Championships, with women such as Karyn Marshall (US) and Cai Jun (China) amongst the winners in that first year. Yet it was not until the 2000 Olympic Games in Sydney, Australia, that women's weightlifting was incorporated into the Olympics. China's Chen Yanqing became an early star of women's weightlifting at the Olympics—as she won Olympic gold two games in a row, in 2004 and 2008.

In 2011, the International Weightlifting Federation (IWF) ruled that athletes could wear a full body "unitard" under the customary weightlifting uniform. Kulsoom Abdullah became the first woman to do so at the U.S. National Championships that year, and athletes are allowed to do so at the Olympics. IWF rules previously stated that an athlete's knees and elbows must be visible so officials can determine if a lift is correctly executed.

== Equipment ==
=== Barbell ===
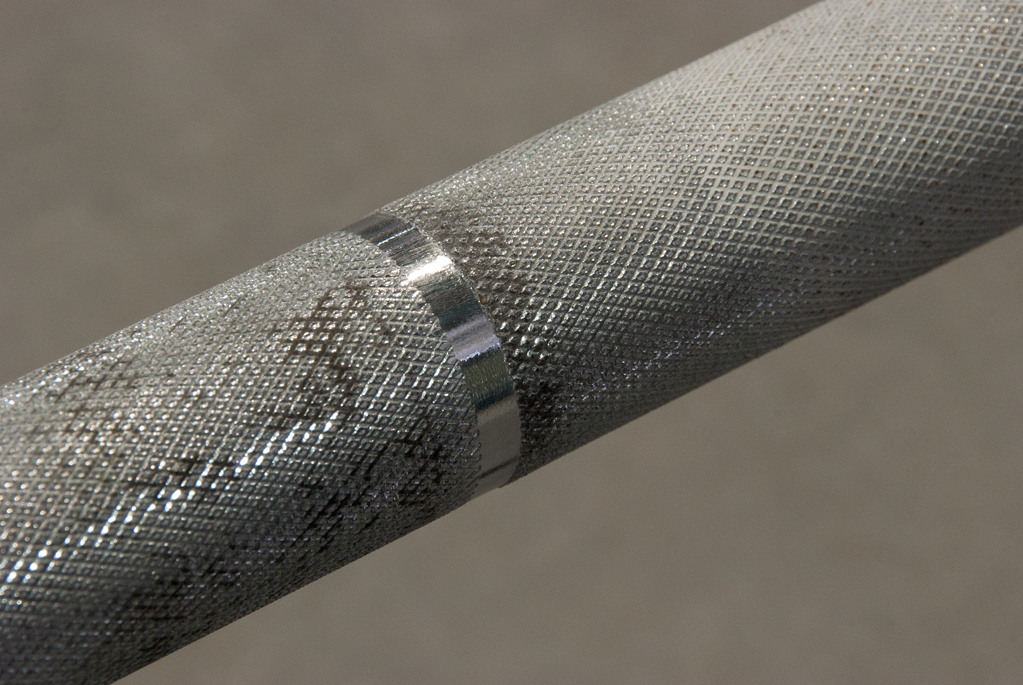
Knurling on an Olympic barbell

Olympic weightlifting uses a steel bar (also known as a barbell) with larger-diameter rotating sleeves on either end, holding rubber-coated weight plates of different weights. This sleeve rotation is important for the Olympic lifts, particularly the snatch and clean movements, because it drastically reduces the rotational inertia of the bar. Without sleeve rotation, the Olympic lifter faces more challenging lifts and a greater risk of injury.

A men's Olympic barbell weighs 20 kg (44 lbs) with a shaft diameter of 28 mm and a length of 2200 mm, whereas a women's Olympic barbell weighs 15 kg (33 lbs) and has a shaft diameter of 25 mm with a length of 2010 mm. The distance between the sleeves, however, is the same for the men's and the women's bars at 1310 mm. The grip texture of the bar is called the knurling, and is distributed differently between the men's and women's bars: the men's has knurling in the center but the women's does not. The Olympic barbells used in competition are certified by the IWF.

=== Bumper plates ===
The weight plates, typically referred to as "bumper plates" because of their rubber coated design, weigh between 10 kg and 25 kg in 5 kg increments. The bumper plates are coated with rubber to allow the weights to be dropped from various heights—either after a successful lift or during an unsuccessful one. Olympic bumper plates conform to international standards for coloring. That is, 10 kg is green, 15 kg is yellow, 20 kg is blue, and 25 kg is red.

=== Competition iron plates ===
In addition to the rubber bumpers, smaller competition iron plates can be used to add weight in small increments to the bar. The color designations for these iron plates are as follows: 1 kg is green, 1.5 kg is yellow, 2 kg is blue, 2.5 kg is red, 5 kg and 0.5 kg are white. It is useful to note the color assignment of these iron plates is consistent with the heavier bumper plates (i.e. 1 kg and 10 kg are green, 1.5 kg and 15 kg are yellow, etc.).

=== Collars ===
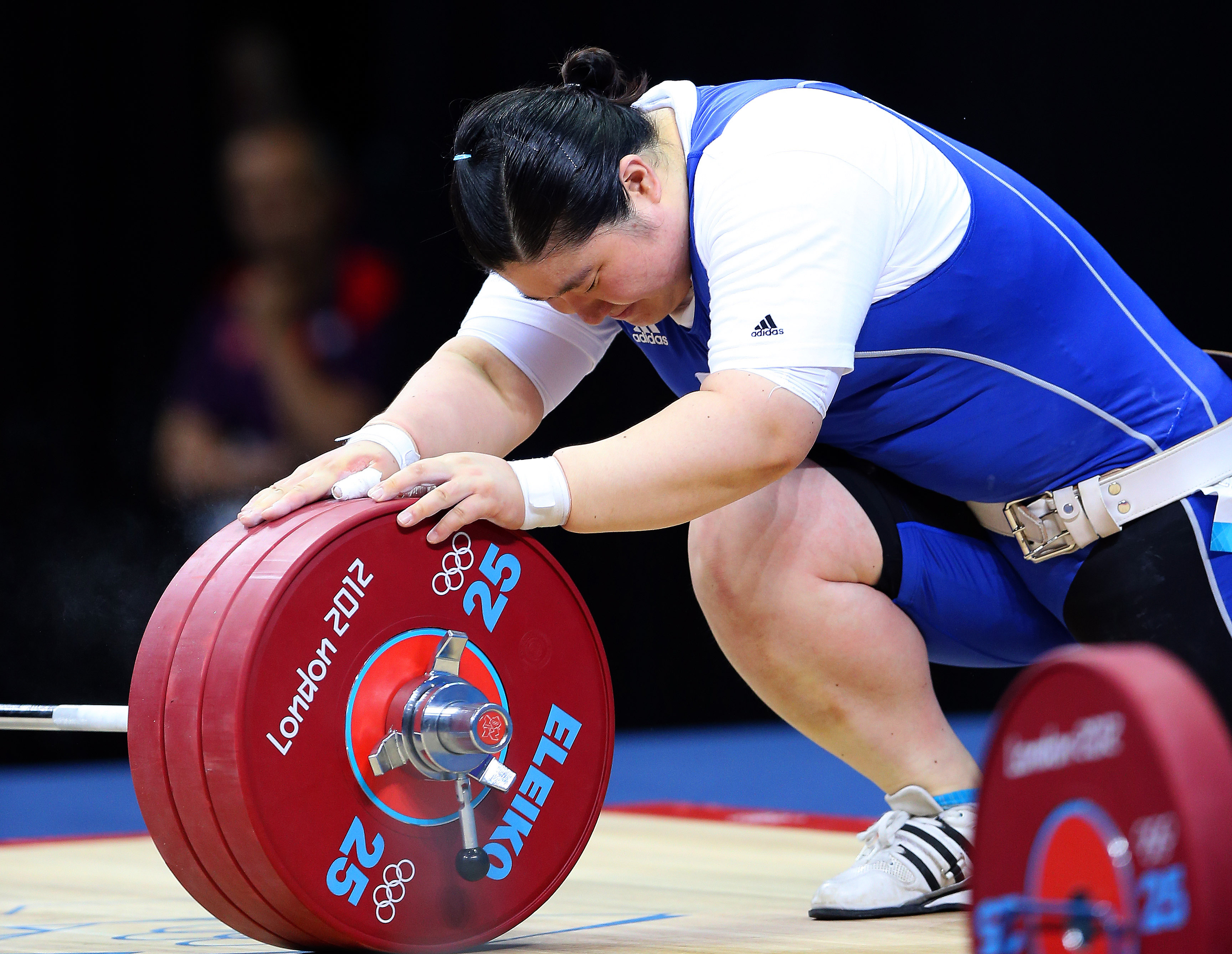
An Olympic lifter, Jang Mi-ran, holding a barbell loaded with red 25 kg bumper plates, held in place with a collar. Note the lifter's taped wrists and thumbs, her weightlifting shoes, and her weightlifting belt.

Weight plates are secured to the bar using collars on each side that weigh exactly 2.5 kg each.

=== Singlet ===
Lifters typically wear a one-piece close-fitting leotard often called a singlet. The wearing of a T-shirt underneath the singlet is optional.

=== Belt ===
A weightlifting belt of 120 mm maximum width may also be worn to increase intra-abdominal pressure.

=== Chalk ===
Chalk is regularly used by Olympic lifters, generally prior to each attempt at a lift. Lifters rub their hands with the chalk to promote dryness and prevent the bar moving in their hands.

=== Tape ===
Olympic lifters frequently use tape to cover the areas of their bodies exposed to friction while completing Olympic lifts. Tape is most commonly found on the Olympic lifter's thumb. A taped thumb not only lessens the risk of calluses, but it also reduces the pain associated with the hook grip.

Olympic lifters also tape their wrists, preventing exaggerated and uncomfortable joint movement during lifts. For particularly heavy overhead lifts, a taped wrist enables the lifter to regulate wrist extension and delimit the translation of the radius and ulna distal heads. However, while taped wrists can prevent wrist and forearm injuries in the short-term, excessive use can lead to weakened connective tissue in the area, increasing the risk of pain and injury.

=== Shoes ===
The type of shoes worn by Olympic weightlifters is perhaps their most distinctive piece of equipment. Weightlifting shoes are typically designed with a raised heel of 0.5" to 1.5" and one or two metatarsal straps that tighten across the instep of the shoe. The raised heel helps the lifter maintain an upright torso while catching the bar and also allows for a deeper squat under the bar. The soles of the shoes are also quite rigid, helping to resist compression while under heavy loads. The shoes are designed for maximum stability while remaining flexible in the toe box. This allows the lifter to come up on the toes and to catch the weight on the ball of the back foot during the "jerk" movement of the lift.

There are also different heel constructions. Most modern Weightlifting shoes use a hard TPU plastic heel that does not deform and is more durable than other materials. However, there has been a resurgence in premium shoes using retro wood heels which are hard but do not last as long.

Knee sleeves

Some weightlifters may use knee sleeves to provide joint support and assist in standing from the deep squatting position.

Wrist wraps

Wrist wraps are commonly used to provide support to the joint.

== See also ==
- World Weightlifting Championships
- Weightlifting at the Summer Olympics
- List of world records in Olympic weightlifting
- List of Olympic records in weightlifting
- List of Olympic medalists in weightlifting
- Powerlifting
- Power training
- Paralympic powerlifting
