= Dumbbell =

Equipment used in weight training

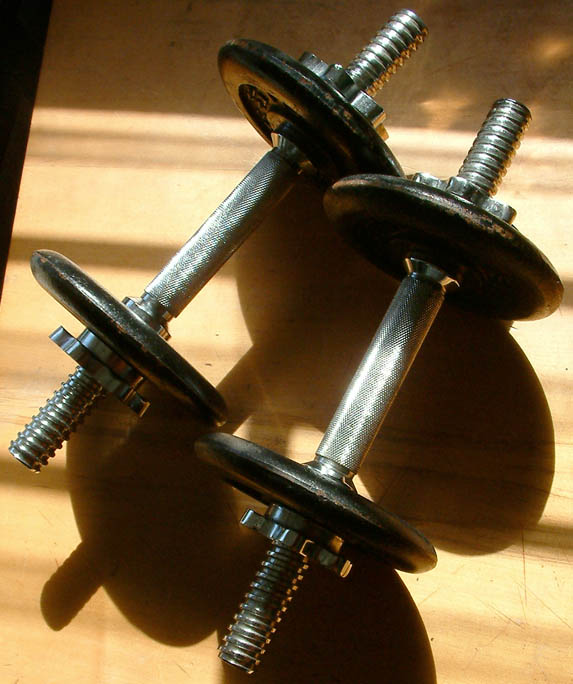
A pair of adjustable dumbbells with 2 kg plates

The dumbbell, a type of free weight, is a piece of equipment used in weight training. It is usually used individually and/or in pairs, with one in each hand.

== History ==
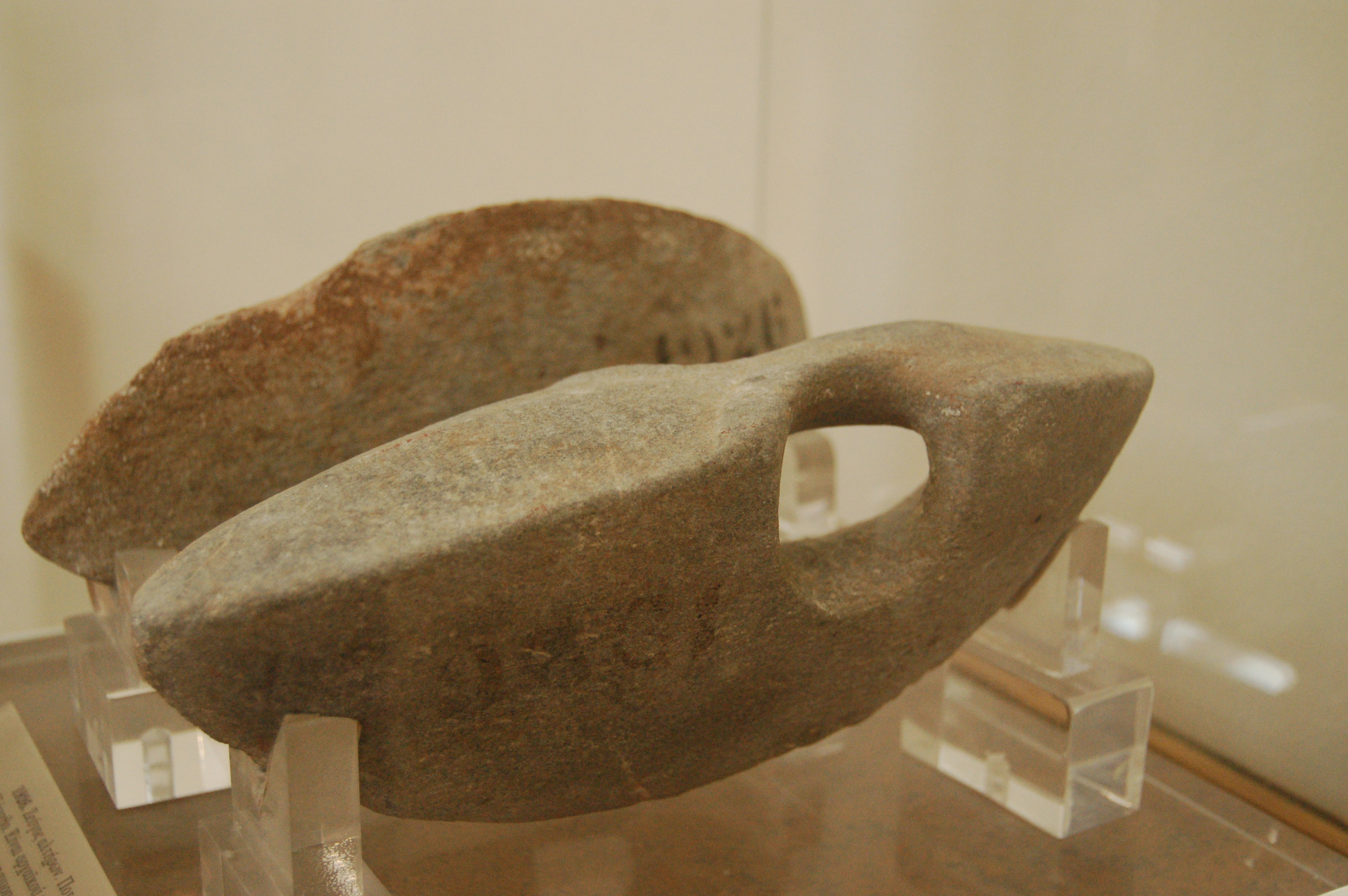
Dumbbells (halteres) used in athletic games in ancient Greece; held at the National Archaeological Museum, Athens.

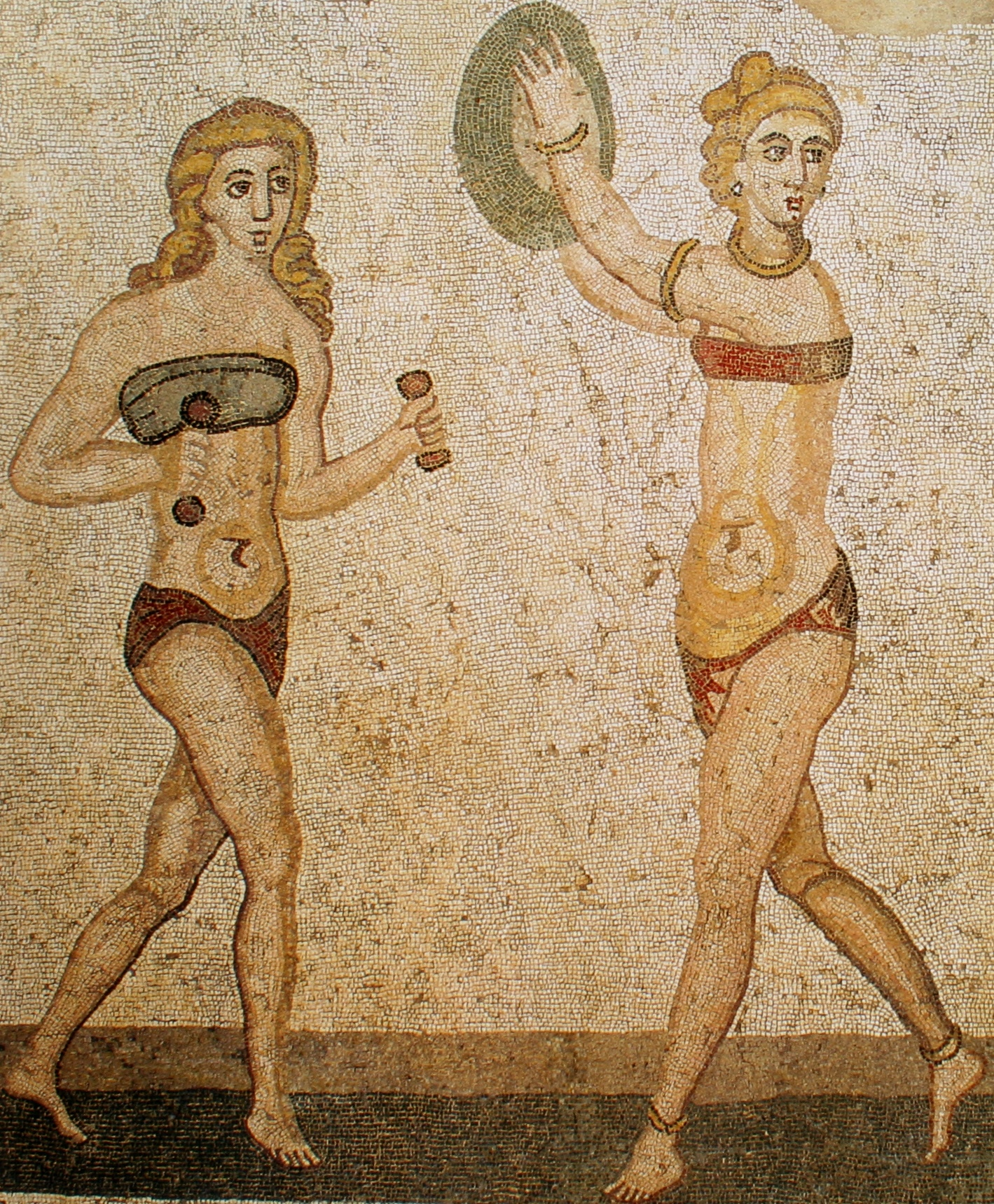
A woman is shown exercising with dumbbells on this Roman mosaic, c. 286–305 AD.

The forerunner of the dumbbell, halteres, were used in ancient Greece as lifting weights and also as weights for the ancient Greek version of the long jump. A kind of dumbbell was also used in India for more than a millennium, shaped like a club – so it was named Indian club. The design of the "Meel", as the club was referred to, can be seen as a halfway point between a barbell and a dumbbell. It was generally used in pairs, in workouts by wrestlers, bodybuilders, sports players, and others wishing to increase strength and muscle size.

Following the development of change ringing in England in the 17th century, devices that mimicked the action of a church bell were installed in private houses for the purpose of exercise. These were wooden contraptions in which two crossed bars with weights on the ends were mounted on an axle, around which was wound a length of rope. This mechanism would be elevated within a room, or placed in a garret, with the rope hanging down for a person standing below to pull. The bell itself was replaced by two weighted bars. An example can be seen at Knole House.

== Etymology ==
The term "dumbbell" or "dumb bell" or "dumb-bell" originated in late Stuart England. In 1711 the poet Joseph Addison mentioned exercising with a "dumb bell" in an essay published in The Spectator.

The Oxford English Dictionary describes "apparatus similar to that used to ring a church bell, but without the bell, so noiseless or ‘dumb’", implying the action of pulling a bell rope to practice English bellringing.

== Types ==
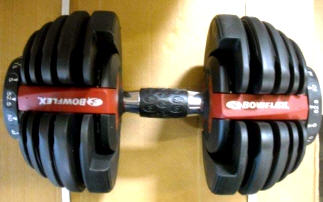
Selectorized dumbbells

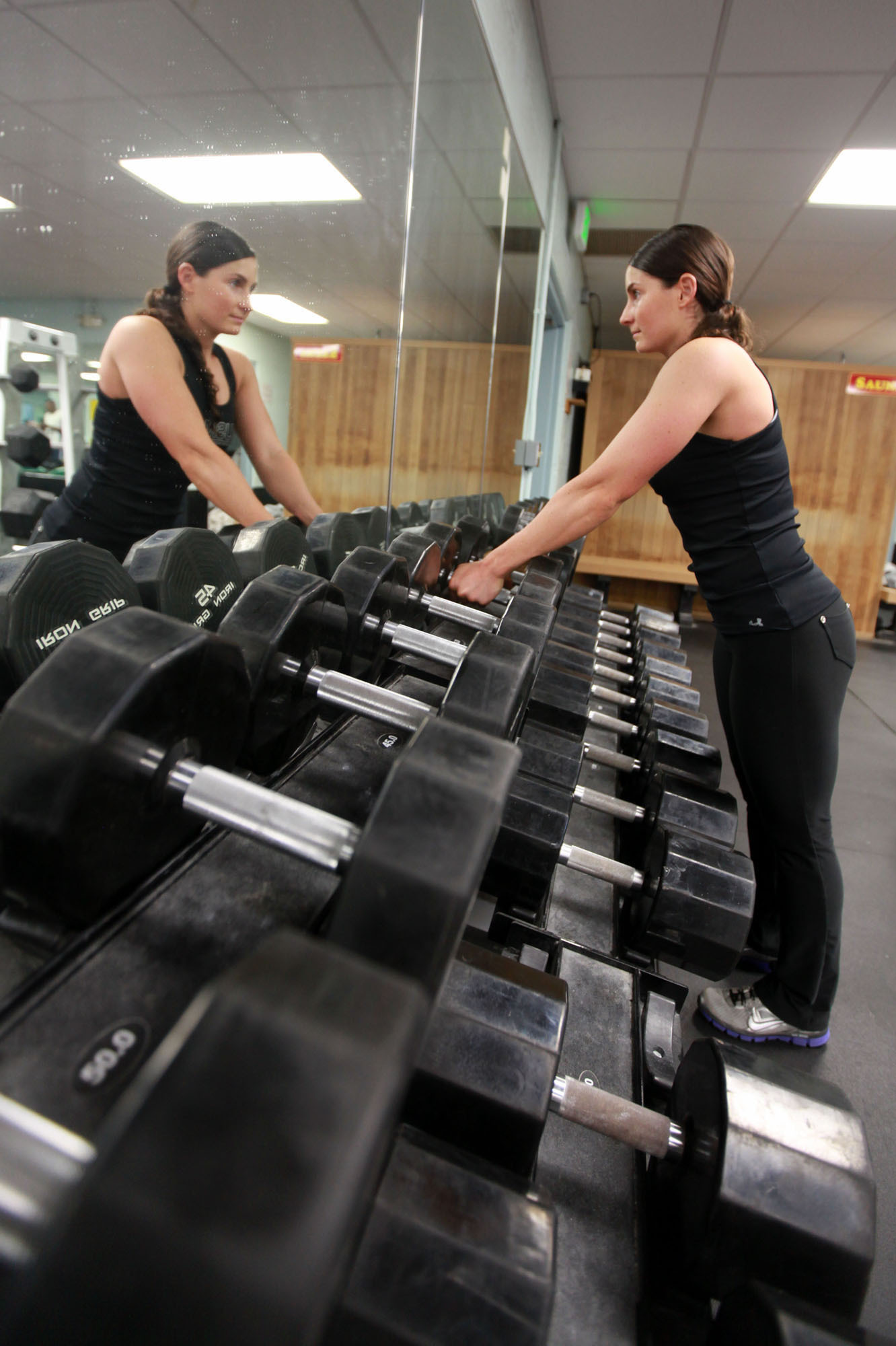
A set of fixed-weight dumbbells

By the early 17th century, the familiar shape of the dumbbell, with two equal weights attached to a handle, had appeared. There are currently three main types of dumbbell:

- Fixed-weight dumbbells are weights created in a dumbbell shape. Inexpensive varieties consist of cast iron, sometimes coated with rubber or neoprene for comfort, and even cheaper versions consist of a rigid plastic shell that is filled with concrete.
- Adjustable dumbbells consist of a metal bar whose centre portion is often engraved with a crosshatch pattern (knurling) to improve grip. Weight plates are slid onto the outer portions of the dumbbell and secured with clips or collars. Shown to the right is a "spinlock" dumbbell, whose ends are threaded to accept large nuts as collars. Alternatively, a dumbbell may have smooth ends with plates being secured by a sprung collar.
  - Plate-loaded (adjustable) dumbbells (a.k.a. loadable dumbbells)
    - Spin-lock
    - Spring collar clips
    - Compression ring collar
    - Ironmaster quick-lock
  - Selectorized (adjustable) dumbbells are adjustable dumbbells that allow you to easily alter the weight or number of plates while the dumbbells are resting in the stand. This is accomplished through controlling the amount of plates that follow the handle when lifted, for as by turning a dial or sliding a selector pin, rather than physically adding or removing plates. This makes it simple to adjust the weight of the dumbbell between exercises, and the stand is typically used to hold extra weights that aren't required for a certain exercise. There are different types of mechanism:
    - Block type
    - Dial type
    - Glide type
    - Twist type
  - 2-in-1 dumbbell/barbell

=== Variations ===
- Thomas Inch dumbbell, also known as "172" (2.38 inches (60 mm) handle, weighs 172 pounds (78 kg))
- Millennium dumbbell (2.38 inches (60 mm) handle, weighs 228 pounds (103 kg))
- Circus dumbbells: historically used in traveling circus acts, these dumbbells have exaggerated ends and wider handles, and just like normal dumbbells, come in various weights and sizes.

== See also ==
- Barbell
- Bulgarian bag
- Kettlebell
- Pool dumbbell
- Weight lifting belt
- Weights
