= Barbell =

Type of exercise equipment

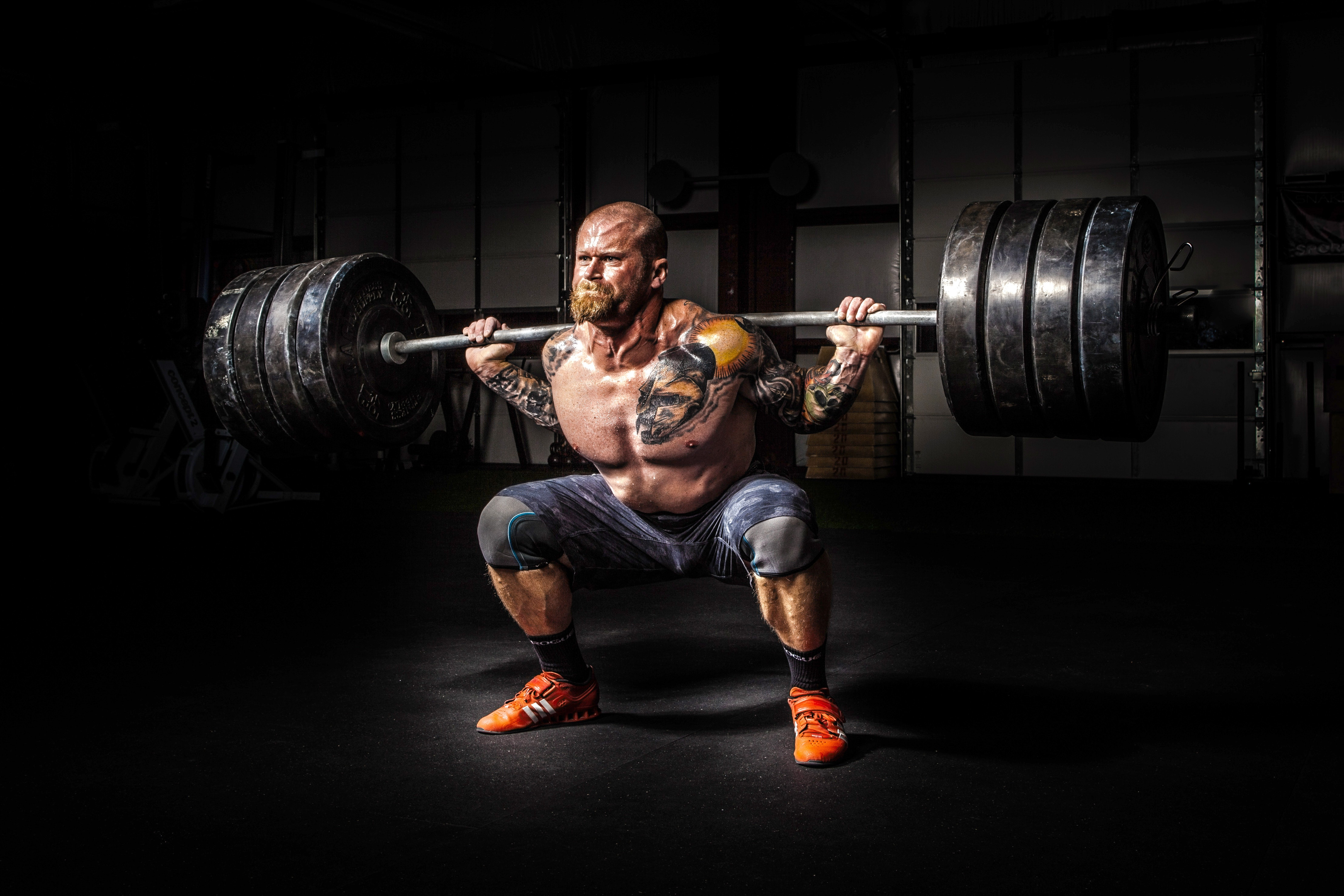
A man performing a squat with a barbell loaded with four weight plates on each end

A barbell is a piece of exercise equipment used in weight training, bodybuilding, weightlifting, powerlifting and strongman, consisting of a long bar, usually with weights attached at each end.

Barbells range in length from 1.2 metres (4 ft) to above 2.4 metres (8 ft), although bars longer than 2.2 metres (7.2 ft) are used primarily by powerlifters and are not commonplace. The central portion of the bar varies in diameter from 25 millimetres (0.98 in) to 50 millimetres (1.96 in) (e.g., Apollon's Axle), and is often engraved with a knurled crosshatch pattern to help lifters maintain a solid grip. Weight plates slide onto the outer portions of the bar to increase or decrease the desired total weight. Collars are used to prevent plates from moving outward unevenly so that the lifter does not experience uneven force.

The barbell is the longer version of the dumbbell that is used for free weight training and competitive sports, such as powerlifting, Olympic weight lifting, and CrossFit. Many exercises can be done using the barbell, such as bicep curl, bench press, Olympic weightlifting, overhead press, deadlift, and squat. Olympic barbells are usually an estimated weight of 20 kilograms (44 lb). Many fitness categories use the barbell for different reasons. For example, powerlifters use the barbell to perform compound exercise movements.

== Use in Olympic weightlifting ==
=== Men's bar ===
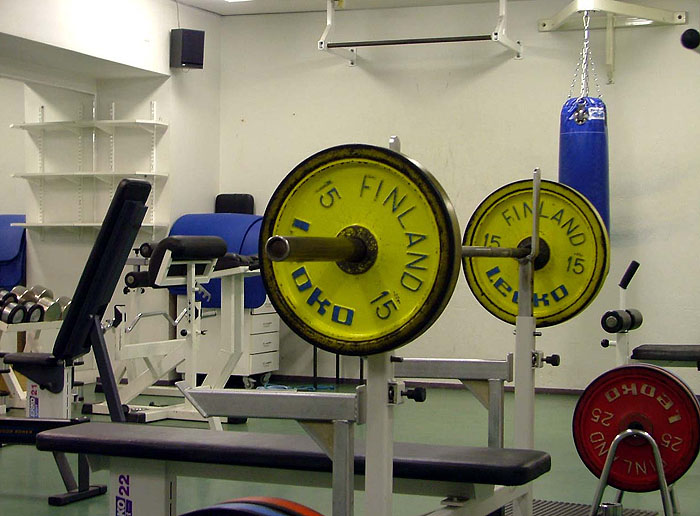
An Olympic bar mounted on a bench press bench

A men's Olympic bar is a metal bar that is 2.2 metres (7.2 ft) long and weighs 20 kilograms (44 lb). The outer ends are 1.96 inches (50 mm) in diameter, while the grip section is 28 millimetres (1.1 in) in diameter, and 1.31 metres (4.3 ft) in length. The bars have grip marks spaced 910 millimetres (36 in) apart to allow intuitive grip width measurement. It is the standard used in competitive weightlifting where men and women compete at the highest level: the Commonwealth Games, Pan-American Games, World Championships, and the Olympics. Bars of this kind must have suitable "whip" (ability to store elastic energy) and sleeves which rotate smoothly, as well as the capacity to withstand dropped lifts from overhead.

=== Women's bar ===
A women's Olympic bar is similar to the men's bar, but is shorter and lighter—2.01 metres (6.6 ft), and 15 kilograms (33 lb)—with a smaller grip section diameter (25 millimetres (0.98 in)). Also in contrast to the men's bar, the women's bar does not sport a center knurl.

== Bumper plates ==
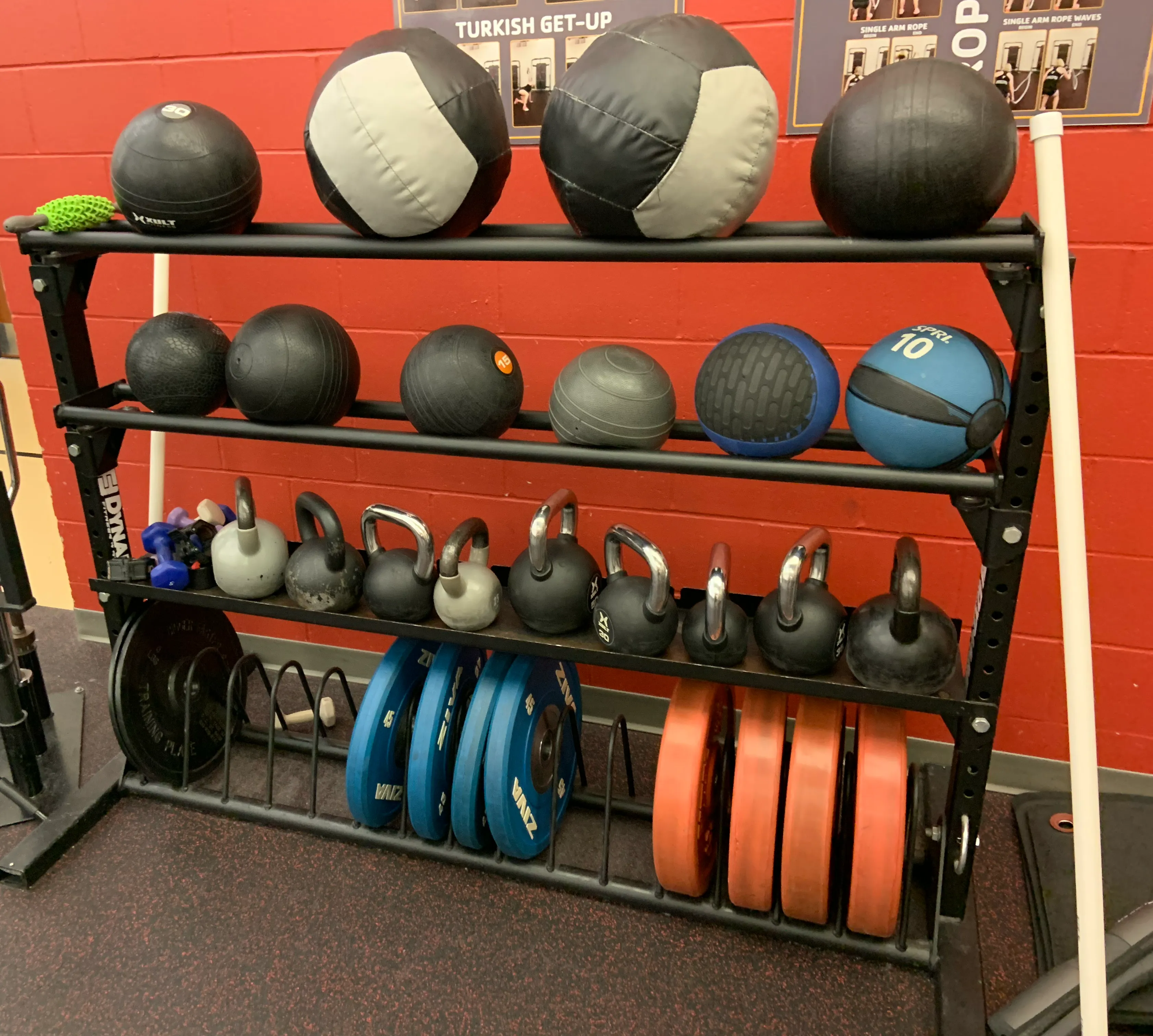
Bumper plates stored on bottom rack

Weight plates used in Olympic lifting, which are often termed "bumper" plates, are coated in solid rubber to make them safer to drop from above head height. General strength training or powerlifting plates are made from cast iron and are considerably cheaper.

Currently, the following colour code is required by International Weightlifting Federation:

Colour	Weight (kg)	Weight (lb)
red	25	55.12
blue	20	44.09
yellow	15	33.07
green	10	22.05
white	5	11.02
red	2.5	5.51
blue	2	4.41
yellow	1.5	3.31
green	1	2.20
white	0.5	1.10

50 kilograms (110 lb) green bumper plates were only officially approved for use by IWF from 1976 to 1980, Montreal being the only Olympic venue where they were deployed.

Presently, Olympic plates of 10 kilograms (22 lb) or more are 450 millimetres (18 in) in diameter. 450 millimetres (18 in) versions also exist of the lighter 5 kilograms (11 lb) and 2.5 kilograms (5.5 lb) plates to accommodate the proper starting position for beginner athletes. These can be aluminium or plastic and may have rubber edges.

== Powerlifting ==
As a general rule, powerlifting requires use of stiffer bars to better accommodate the heavier weights being used in the sport. The deadlift barbell is usually the longest, thinnest and the most flexible, thus allowing more weight to be lifted. Powerlifting barbells use simpler, more robust bushings because they do not need to rotate as fast as Olympic weightlifting barbells. Sometimes the sleeves of powerlifting bars are also extended. Additionally, powerlifting bars have their grip marks spaced closer, at 810 millimetres (31.9 in). This closer spacing is used to check legal grip width in the bench press. Powerlifting utilizes the same bar for both male and female competitors.

The International Powerlifting Federation requires using strictly the same kind of bar on all lifts, being between 28 millimetres (1.1 in) and 29 millimetres (1.1 in) in diameter, not more than 2.2 metres (7.2 ft) in overall length, and between 1.31 metres (4.3 ft) and 1.32 metres (4.3 ft) between the inner faces of the collars. Another visual difference from typical Olympic bar or International Paralympic Committee approved one is that the IPF bar's knurling shall not be covered by chrome. Stating that bar should weigh 25 kg (55 lb) with collars on, effectively permits use of 20 kg (44 lb) bars only, because same as IWF, IPF requires collars to weigh 2.5 kg (5.5 lb) each.

The total weight of the barbell varies based on the type and number of plates loaded onto the ends of the bar and the lift being performed, and easily can be 540 kilograms (1,190 lb) or more with a squat dedicated bar (which itself can weigh up to 29 kg (65 lb) and have up to 35 mm (1.4 in) grip section diameter).

Additionally, differently coloured plates are or were used outside of IWF sanctioned competition, most prominently in powerlifting.

These include:

Colour	Weight (kg)	Weight (lb)
	50	110.23
	50	110.23
	45.36	100
	45.36	100
	45.36	100
	25	55.12
	20.41	45
	20	44.09
	15.88	35
	15	33.07
	11.34	25
	10	22.05
	10	22.05
	10	22.05
	5	11.02
	5	11.02
	5	11.02
	4.54	10
	2.5	5.51
	2.5	5.51
	2.5	5.51
	2.27	5
	1.25	2.76
	1.25	2.76
	1.13	2.5
	0.57	1.25
	0.5	1.10
	0.5	1.10
	0.5	1.10
	0.25	0.55

Powerlifting plates in contrast to Olympic lifting ones are usually thinner (to accommodate more plates on bar) and as they are not meant to be dropped, do not need to utilize additional coating.

100 pounds (45 kg) plates are fairly rare, typically only used in some of the powerlifting federations still using plate sets scaled in pounds, such as IPA, SPF and their affiliates.

Black 50 kilograms (110 lb) polyurethane coated plates were introduced by Eleiko in International Paralympic Committee sanctioned London 2012 Paralympic Games. Apart from them and 0.25 kilograms (0.55 lb) record discs, IPC approved set uses the same plates as the IWF one.

Technically, 10 kilograms (22 lb) and smaller plates can be of any colour in IPF approved sets, although only colours listed above were used for them by few certified manufacturers.

== Non-competition equipment ==
Most "Olympic" bars one can see in commercial gyms, although superficially similar to real Olympic bars to the untrained eye, do not share International Weightlifting Federation or powerlifting essential characteristics. They are known as multi-purpose or hybrid barbells that typically share features of both Weightlifting and Powerlifting barbells. For example, they have a shaft diameter of 28.5 mm which is between Weightlifting and Powerlifting bars. Further, they have dual knurl markings and typically have bushings or a combination of bearings and bushings to provide enough spin for the Olympic lifts while maintaining performance during heavy strength training exercises.

Weight plates used outside of competition need not conform to IWF or powerlifting specifications, and can be of any colour. Kraiburg bumper plates are rated in pounds, and one notch lighter than expected, regarding their traditional place in colour code: red plates are 45 pounds (20 kg), blue ones 35 pounds (16 kg), etc.

== Collars ==
Standard collars can be of any material, usually metal, and they can weigh up to 2.5 kilograms (5.5 lb) each for both men and women.

Typical Olympic bar with a pair of collars, the plates not counted, can weigh as much as 25 kilograms (55 lb) for men and 20 kilograms (44 lb) for women depending on the collars.

== Pads ==
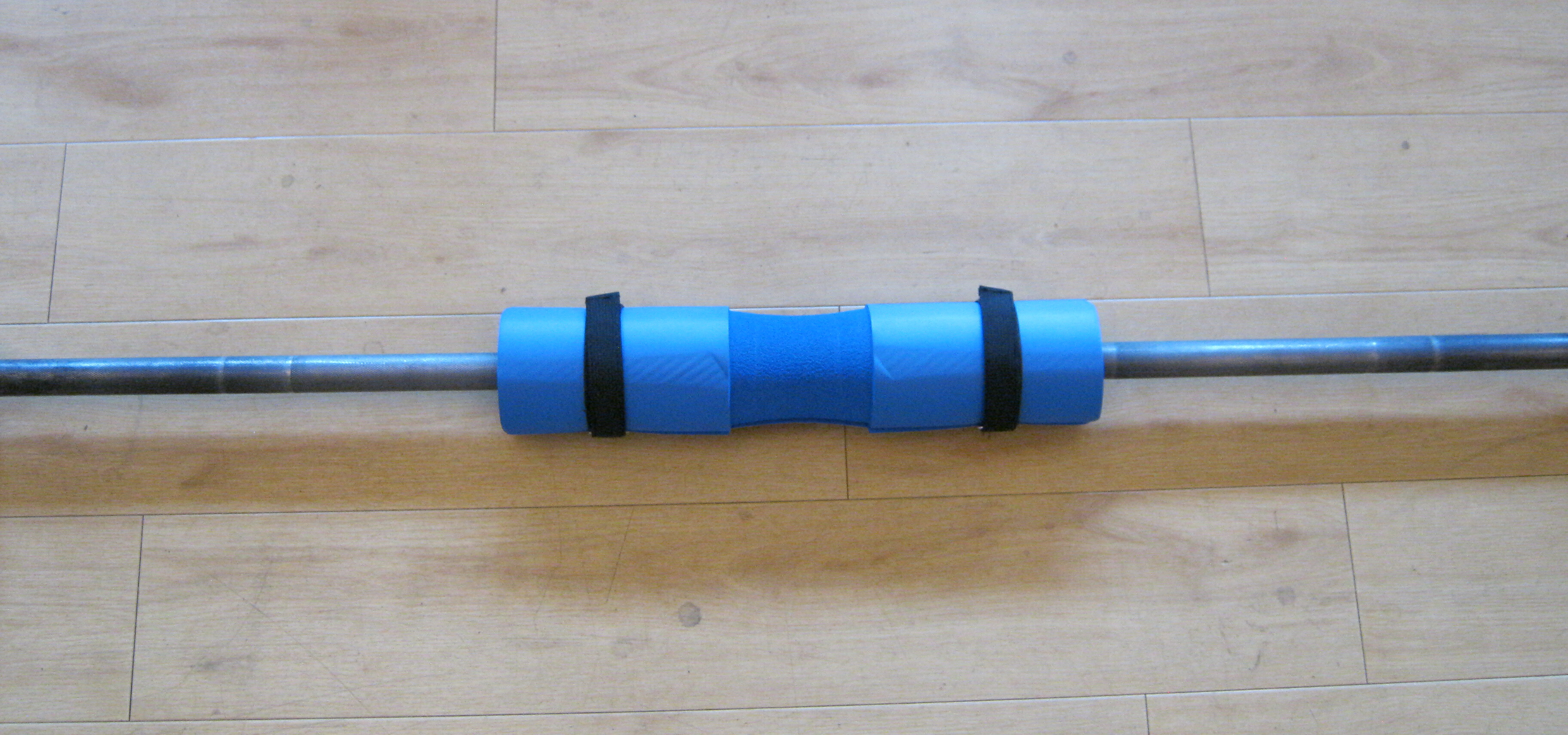
A barbell pad can be used to add a cushioning layer for high bar squats and hip thrusts.

Barbell pads, also known as squat pads, are sometimes fitted to barbells for comfort and safety reasons. This may be for high bar squats where the bar can exert direct pressure on the spine due to incorrect positioning or the person having insufficient trapezius muscle to form a cushioning layer. Critics, however, argue that the depth of the pad means the bar is held in a less stable position which actually increases the overall pressure on the neck. Hip thrust exercises, where the bar rests across the front of the pelvis, standardly use a barbell pad.

== Other types of barbells ==
=== Berg prototype "Olympic" revolving barbell ===
This barbell was produced by the company Berg in 1910, but designed by Veltum. This was a major turning point in Olympic lifting as the barbell was able to revolve easily during the lift. After the Olympic games in 1928 Amsterdam, the barbells began to become popularized and many companies started to copy the barbell. The Berg barbell and copies of it were spread through many gyms around the world mainly from the 1960s to the 1970s because of the rise of the new barbell.

=== "Standard" or "One Inch" barbells ===
"Standard" or more commonly "One Inch" or "1 inch" barbells are characterised by a bar that is very approximately one inch (25.4mm) in diameter along the whole of its length, with a commensurate sized centre hole in the weight plate.

Despite the "Standard" name they come in a wide range of sizes that can have little in common with one another, and usually range from 25mm (0.98in) to 29mm (1.14 in) in diameter in varying lengths and other dimensions. In contrast with the rotating sleeves and uniform sizes of Olympic bars, which mount plates with a fixed size centre hole; the ends of standard bars do not rotate, and commonly mount plates with centre hole diameters of 27 millimetre (1.06 in) through to 31 millimetre (1.14 in). This variation may prove very problematic if plates are mixed and matched, as plates with smaller holes may not fit the larger diameter "standard" bars. Gauging this by eye is very difficult, so taking the bar (or a micrometer gauge) to check that new plates will fit an existing bar is essential. Alternatively a larger hole plate may rattle or spin on the smaller diameter "standard" bars unless very securely collared. Small circular spring clamp collars are most often used to secure the weights though more permanent fixings are available. Other variations include spinlock end bars with screw on nut collars and many others.

The thickness of the grip section is most commonly 1 1/16 inches (27 mm) in the United States or 28 millimetres (1.1 in) in Europe, but can be thicker or thinner, depending on quality. Neither bar weight nor length is standardized like men's or women's Olympic bars, and can range from 1.22 metres (4.0 ft) to 2.16 metres (7.1 ft). They are rarely rated for more than 500 kg (1,100 lb) of loading. The bar itself can weigh anything from 4kg to 10kg

The main advantages of "Standard" or "One Inch" barbells and weight plates are that they are often easier to store and take up less room; the bars may come apart into two or three sections, weigh less, may also be convertible to dumbbells, and are usually much less expensive than Olympic weights for those on a budget. Weight plates come in cast iron, or coated cast iron, tri grip, or far thicker and cheaper vinyl filled with concrete.

=== Dumbbells ===
Dumbbells are the equivalent of one-handed barbells, with a gripping surface approximately 16 centimetres (6.3 in) and a total length that rarely exceeds 50 centimetres (20 in). Adjustable dumbbells are the most prominent use of "standard" weight plates (those having a 27 millimetres (1.1 in) to 31 millimetres (1.2 in) center hole). Some dumbbell sets come with an attaching bar to convert the pair to a single barbell.

=== EZ curl bars ===
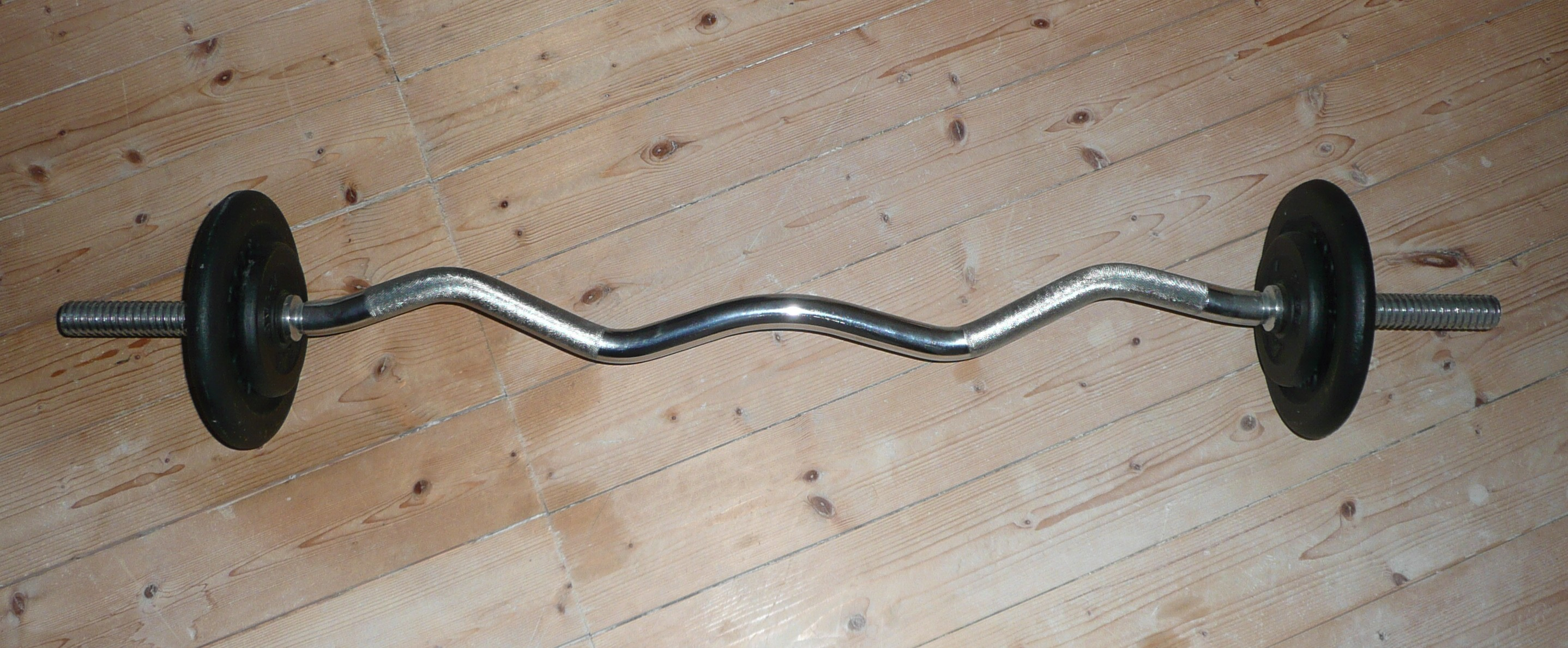
An EZ curl bar

Originally known as a Dymeck curling bar after its inventor Lewis G. Dymeck (US Patent Number 2,508,567), the EZ ("easy") curl bar is a variant of the barbell that is often used for biceps curls, upright rows, and lying triceps extensions. The curved profile of the bar in the grip region allows the user's wrists and forearms to take a more neutral, less supinated position. This reduces the risk of repetitive stress injury in these exercises. However, when performing the biceps curl, using an EZ curl bar prevents full contraction of the biceps, which can only occur with the wrist fully supinated, and thus may prove a less effective exercise.

=== Fixed barbells ===
Primarily found in gyms, these are usually fairly short bars with weights already attached and welded to the bar, and in some cases, a covering of plastic/rubber around the plates. A typical gym might carry a range of fixed barbells from 5 kilos (11 lb) to around 50 kilos (110 lb). They are handy as they take less space than full-length bars and are useful for many exercises where less weight is required. They can also provide an easier starting point for beginners before moving on to using the full olympic bars. In addition, they provide for speedy transitions between various weights if one is doing multiple weights in quick succession.

=== Thick-handled barbells ===
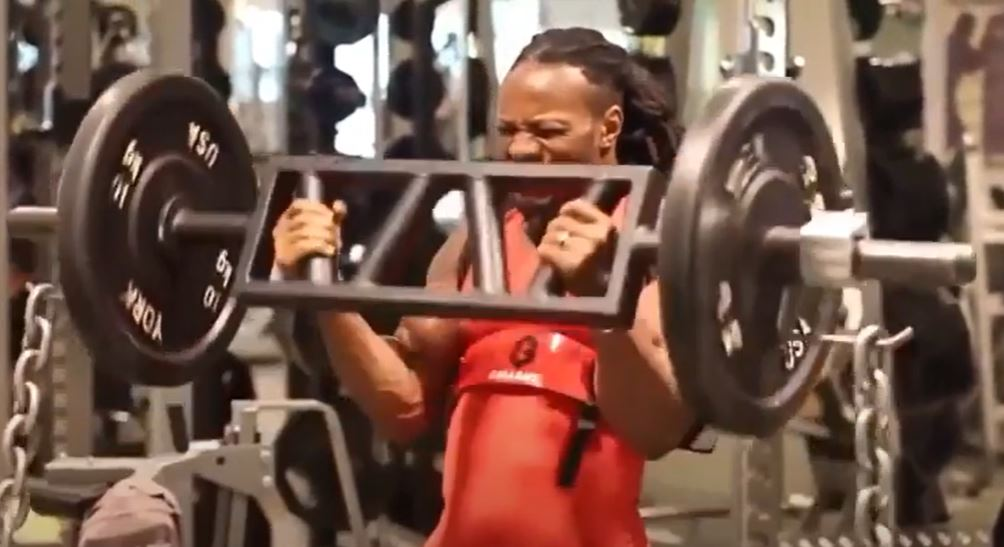
Multi-grip bar, similar to a tricep bar, but with more handles

These specialty items are designed to challenge the grip. They're used in strongman competitions for the deadlift and overhead presses, such as Apollon's Axle. Recently, even such exotic diameters as 76 millimetres (3 in) have appeared. They are made in China, and can weigh up to 61 kilograms (135 lb).

=== Triceps bars ===
Similar in function to an EZ curl bar, the triceps bar consists of two parallel handles mounted in a cage. It is used to perform triceps extensions and hammer curls.

=== Trap bar/hex bars ===
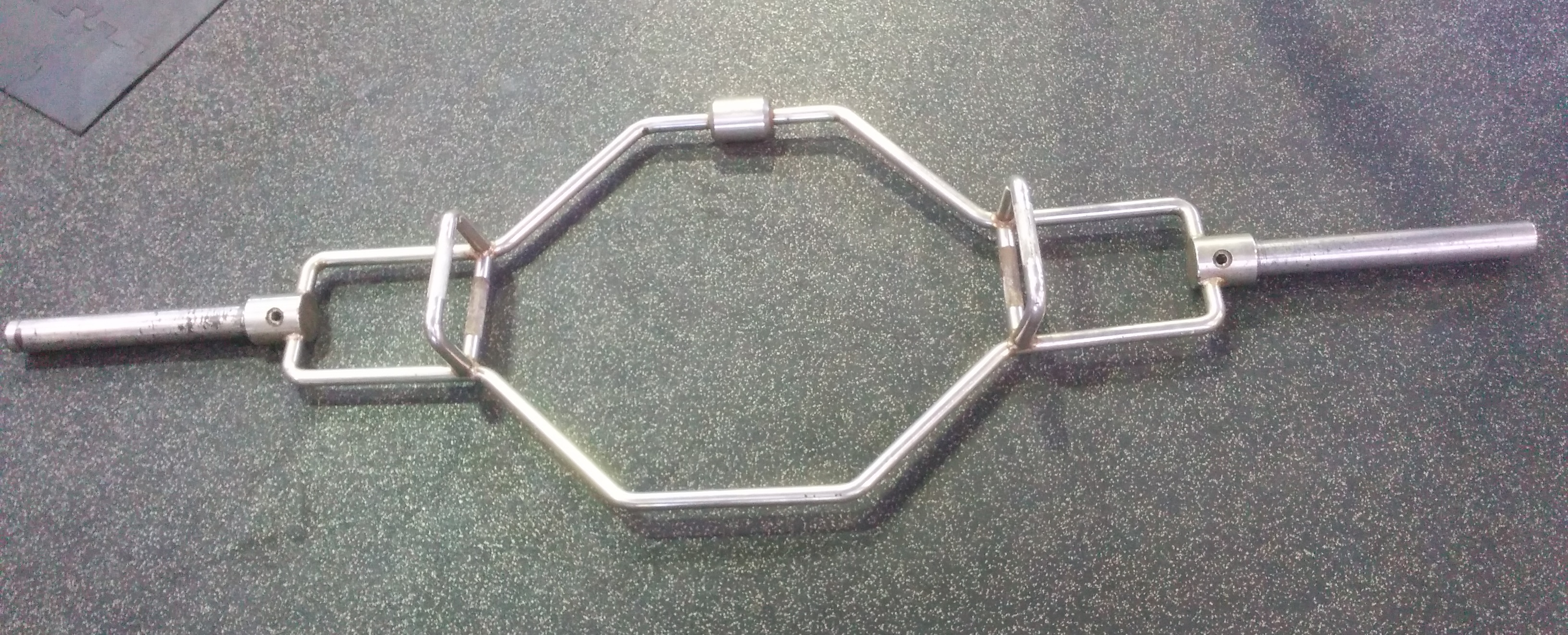
A trap bar

A hexagon-shaped bar in the middle of which the user stands and grasps the bar, via side handles, with a neutral grip. The use of trap bars places the center of gravity closer to the lifter. Trap bars are used primarily for performing deadlifts and shrugs.

=== Safety squat bars ===
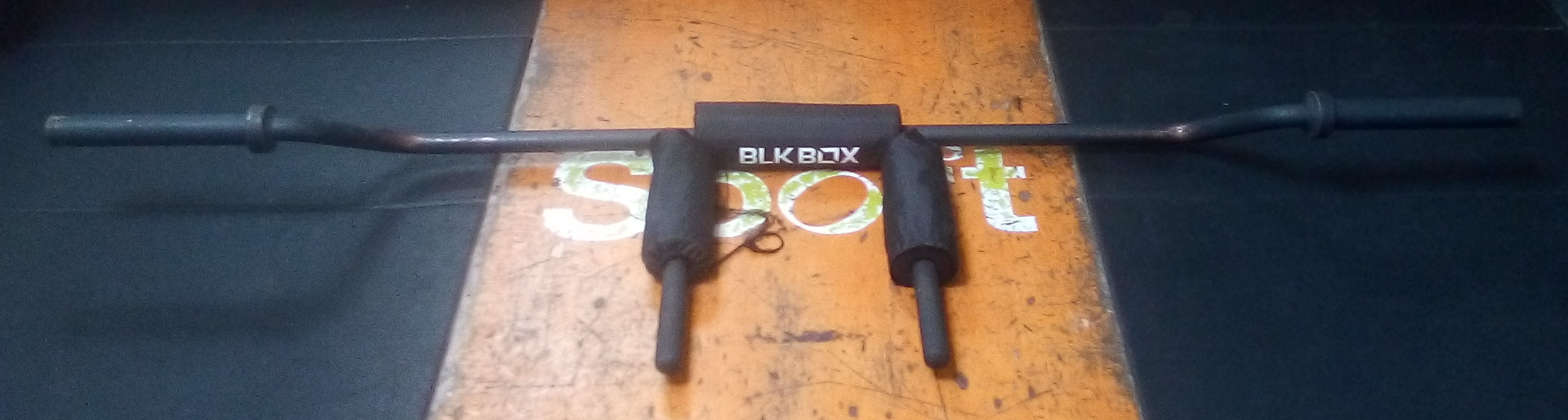
A safety squat bar

A bar with a camber in the middle, two handles and padding. The safety squat bar may help to avoid causing or aggravating injury while squatting.

=== Swiss Barbells ===
The Swiss Barbell or the Multipoint Bar offers multiple hand positions for the user, to offer close grip, overhand and underhand rows or chest exercises; as well as being utilised for bicep and tricep exercises. These barbells vary in weight, with the Mirafit Swiss Barbell weighing 20 kg.

== See also ==
- Kettlebell
