= Weight plate =

Strength training equipment

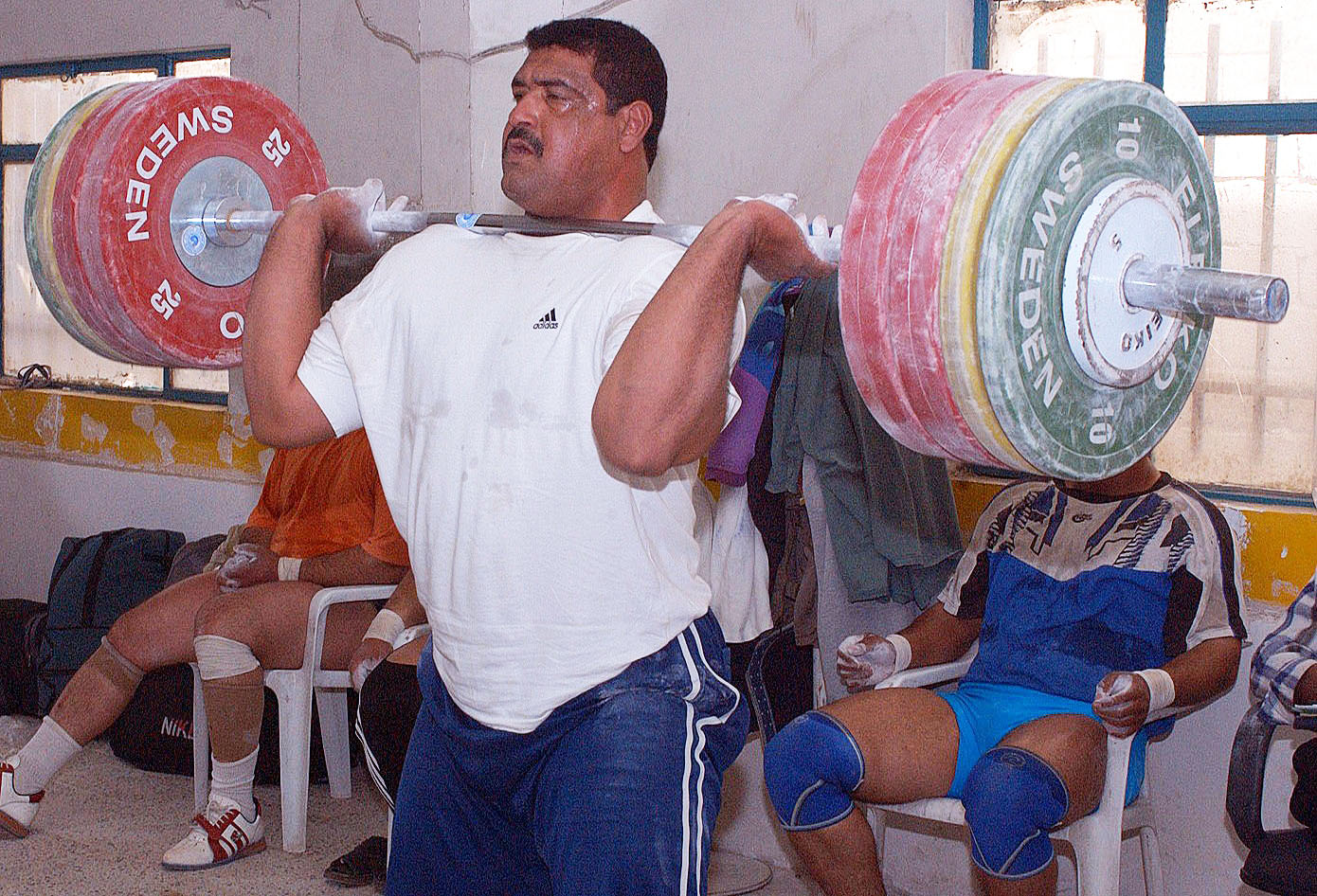
A weightlifter holding an Olympic barbell loaded with plates ranging from 5 to 25 kilograms

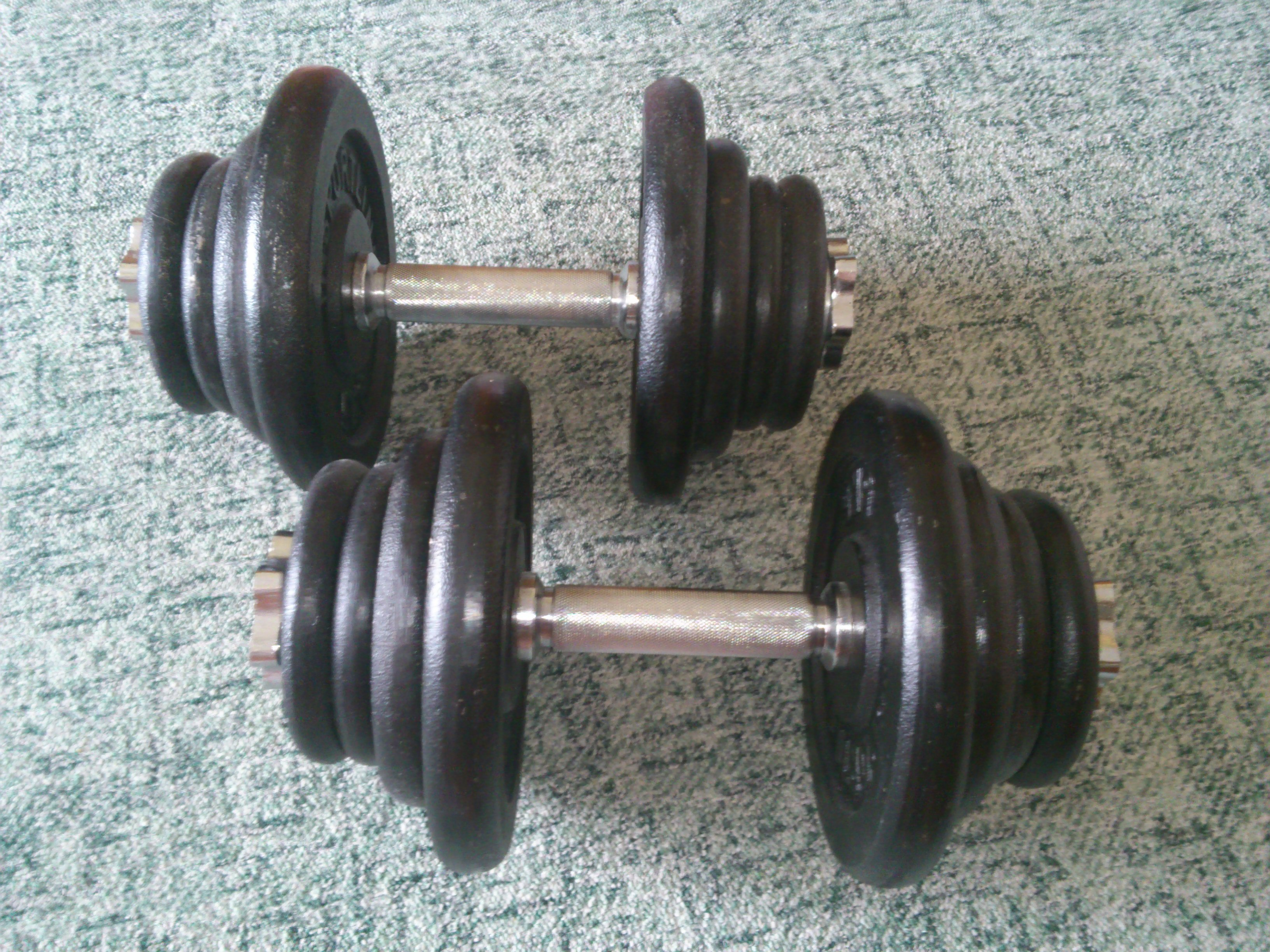
A pair of adjustable dumbbells with "standard" plates

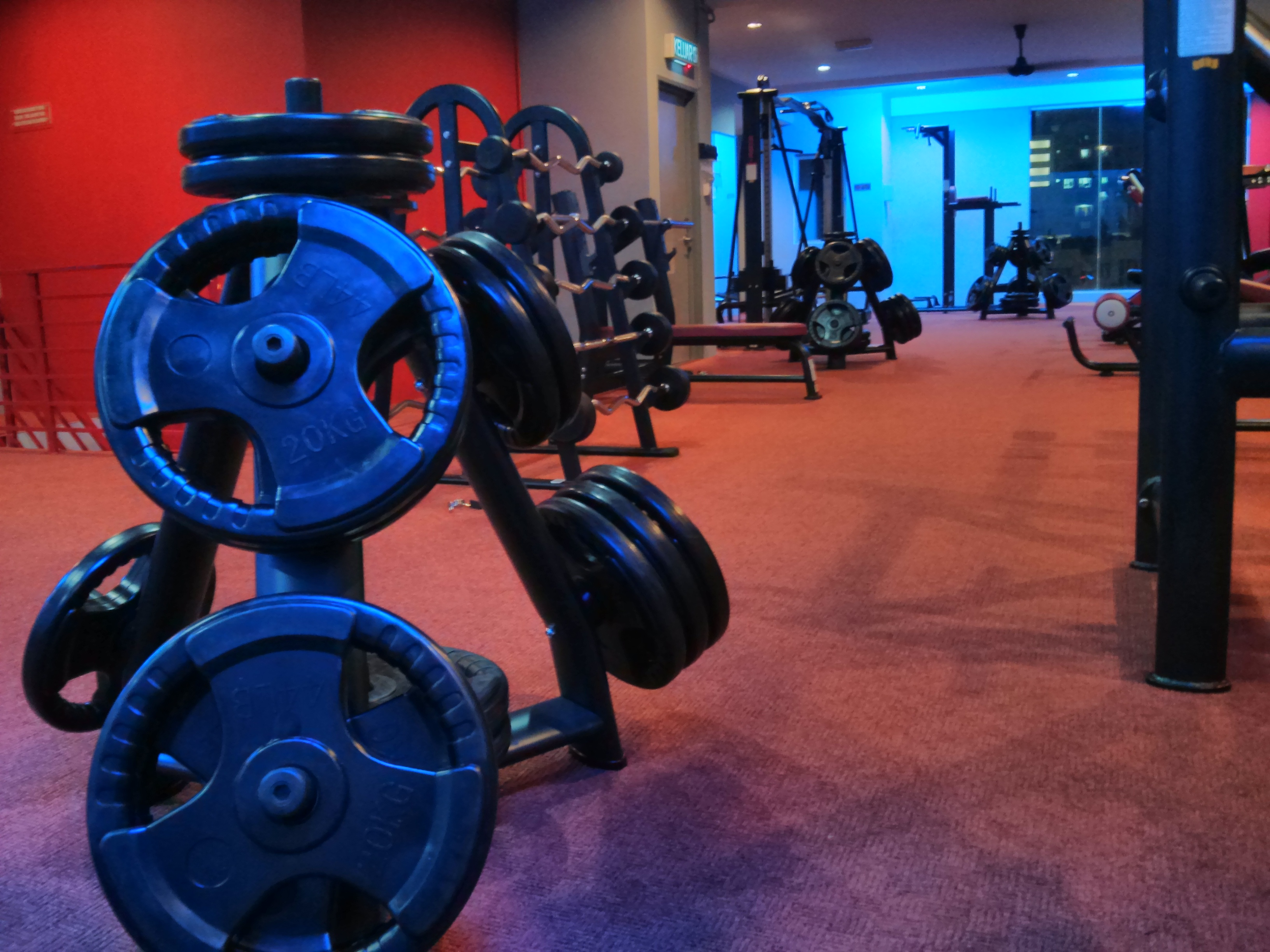
Grip plates arranged on a plate holder (or "plate tree")

A weight plate is a flat, heavy object, usually made of cast iron, that is used in combination with barbells or dumbbells to produce a bar with a desired total weight for the purpose of physical exercise.

Two general categories exist: "standard" plates, which have a center hole of approximately 25 mm (one inch), and "Olympic" plates, meant to fit on the 50 mm (two inches) sleeves of Olympic barbells. Standard plates are usually paired with adjustable dumbbells and Olympic plates with full-size barbells, although standard barbells and Olympic dumbbells exist.

Weight plates may incorporate holes for ease of carrying (called "grip plates") or be solid discs (especially those used for competition). Non-competition plates often have variable diameters and widths, such as on the adjustable dumbbells pictured right, with heavier plates generally being larger in diameter, thickness, or both. Weight plates are typically round, although 12-sided and other polygonal varieties exist. Most plates are coated with enamel paint or hammertone to resist corrosion; more expensive varieties may be coated with chrome, rubber, or plastic.

== Plate sizes ==
Plates are available in a wide range of weights, depending on the material used. Common Olympic plate (50 mm center hole) denominations are in 1.25, 2.5, 5, 10, 15, 20, and 25 kg sizes, or 2.5, 5, 10, 25, 35, and 45 lbs. However, the 0.25, 0.5, 1.25, 2.5 5, 10, 15, 20, and 50 kg, or 1.25 lb, 2.75 lb, 5.5 lb, 11 lb, 22 lb, 33 lb, 44 lb, 65 lb, 70 lb, 100 lb, and 110 lb discs are less commonly seen than other weight plates.

Standard plates (25 mm center hole) are commonly available in 1.25, 2.5, 5, 10, 15, and 20 kg, or 2.5, 5, 10, 25, 35 and 50 lb where pound denominated plates are used. Less commonly seen are plates of 0.5, 1, 2, 4, 6, 6.5, 7.5, 8, 10, and 25 kg, or 1.25, 2.2, 3, 4.4, 7.5, 8.8, 12.5, 13.2, 14.3, 17.6, 20, 22, and 100 lbs..

Bumper plates are commonly available in 5, 10, 15, 20, and 25 kg, or 10, 15, 25, 35, 45, and 55 lb in pound-denominated sets.. Uncommon bumper plate weights come in 50 kg, 65, 70, and 100 lb plates.

== Weight accuracy ==
Low-cost plates can vary widely from their marked weight. A 2% or 3% variation is not uncommon, with plates from some manufacturers frequently being 10% or more over or under (a 45-pound plate can weigh as little as 40 pounds, or as much as 50). Tom Lincir, founder of the Ivanko Barbell Company, has encountered 45-pound (20.4 kg) plates weighing as little as 38 pounds (17.2 kg), or as much as 59 pounds (26.8 kg).

Plates can be weighed, and the equipment marked (using a paint pen or other permanent marker) with the true weight.

Calibrated plates are available from high-end manufacturers; many advertise these plates as being accurate to within 10 grams (0.02 lb) of their marked weight, which is the tolerance mandated by the International Weightlifting Federation for plates used in competition.

== Bumper plates ==
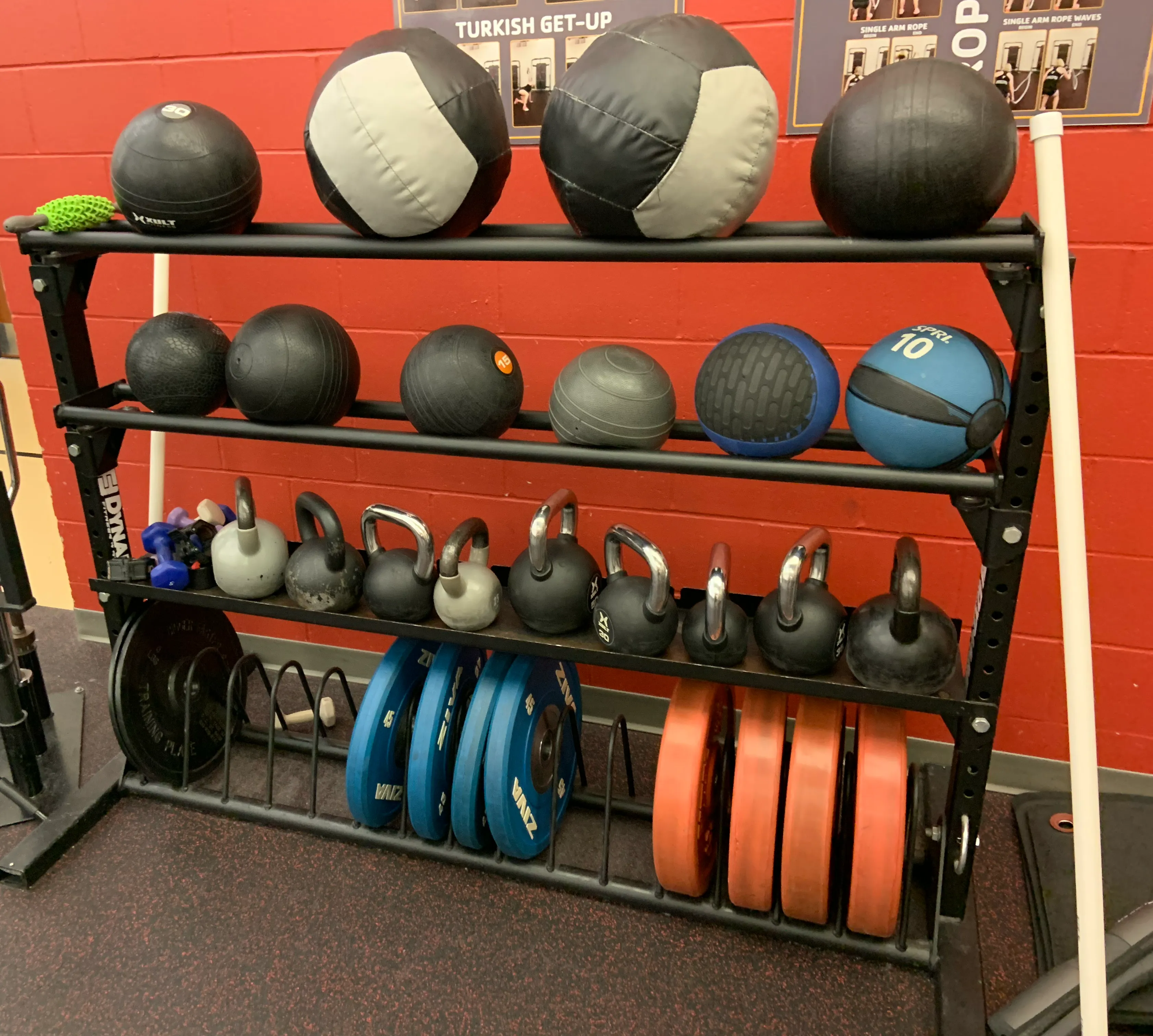
Bumper plates stored on bottom rack

Olympic plates may come in the form of bumper plates, which are made of resilient rubber. These are used for Olympic weightlifting, a category of movements that involve lifting a barbell high overhead, then letting it fall. Their design permits a loaded barbell to be dropped (and to bounce) after a lift, with negligible damage to the floor, plates, and bar. Unlike most iron plates, where heavier plates have larger diameters, bumper plates are all the same diameter, instead varying in thickness and construction. This helps to distribute the force of the dropped barbell across all the plates more evenly, reducing damage to the equipment.

Lower-end bumper plates are generally made of solid rubber with a steel or brass hub. Competition-grade bumper plates are more compact, with a layer of rubber surrounding a steel core.

Bumper plates used in competition have a diameter mandated by the International Weightlifting Federation of 450 millimetres (17.72 in) ±1 millimetre (0.04 in), with lighter plates being narrower than heavier plates. The lightest bumper plates available are generally 5 kilograms (11 lb), or 10 pounds (4.5 kg) in pound-denominated sets. Plates lighter than this are generally smaller in diameter and are known as "change plates" when paired with bumper plates.

As an alternative to rubber plates, "technique plates", made of plastic, are available. Technique plates are more expensive than rubber, but hold up better to repeated drops. Their primary purpose is to allow novice lifters to practice Olympic lifts at lighter weights that can put too much lateral stress on single pairs of rubber plates, damaging them.

== Vinyl plates ==
Standard (25 mm hole) "vinyl" plates are often sold paired with dumbbells or barbells as a low-cost option for casual strength training. These plates are made of cement or sand coated with a polyvinyl chloride sheath. The cement tends to break down over time and leak out of holes in the sheath, and the weights are less dense than iron so that fewer fit on a given bar.

== Weight stacks ==
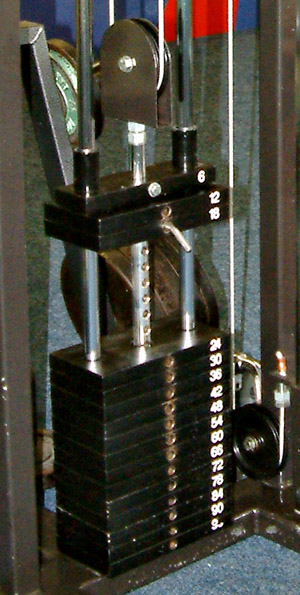
The weight stack on a selectorized cable machine; in this example, each plate weighs 6 kg.

Weight machines commonly use specialized sets of plates (called "weight stacks"), consisting of a set of rectangular plates mounted on rails. Through a cable and pulley system, the burden is transferred to the machine's user. By placing a pin in the stack that causes the cable to pull on each plate above the pin, the weight is selected. This configuration is known as a "selectorized" weight machine.

Some weight machines, such as the sled-type leg press, or the Smith machine, are designed to be loaded with Olympic plates instead of using a cable-driven stack.
