= Knurling =

Patterning of metal

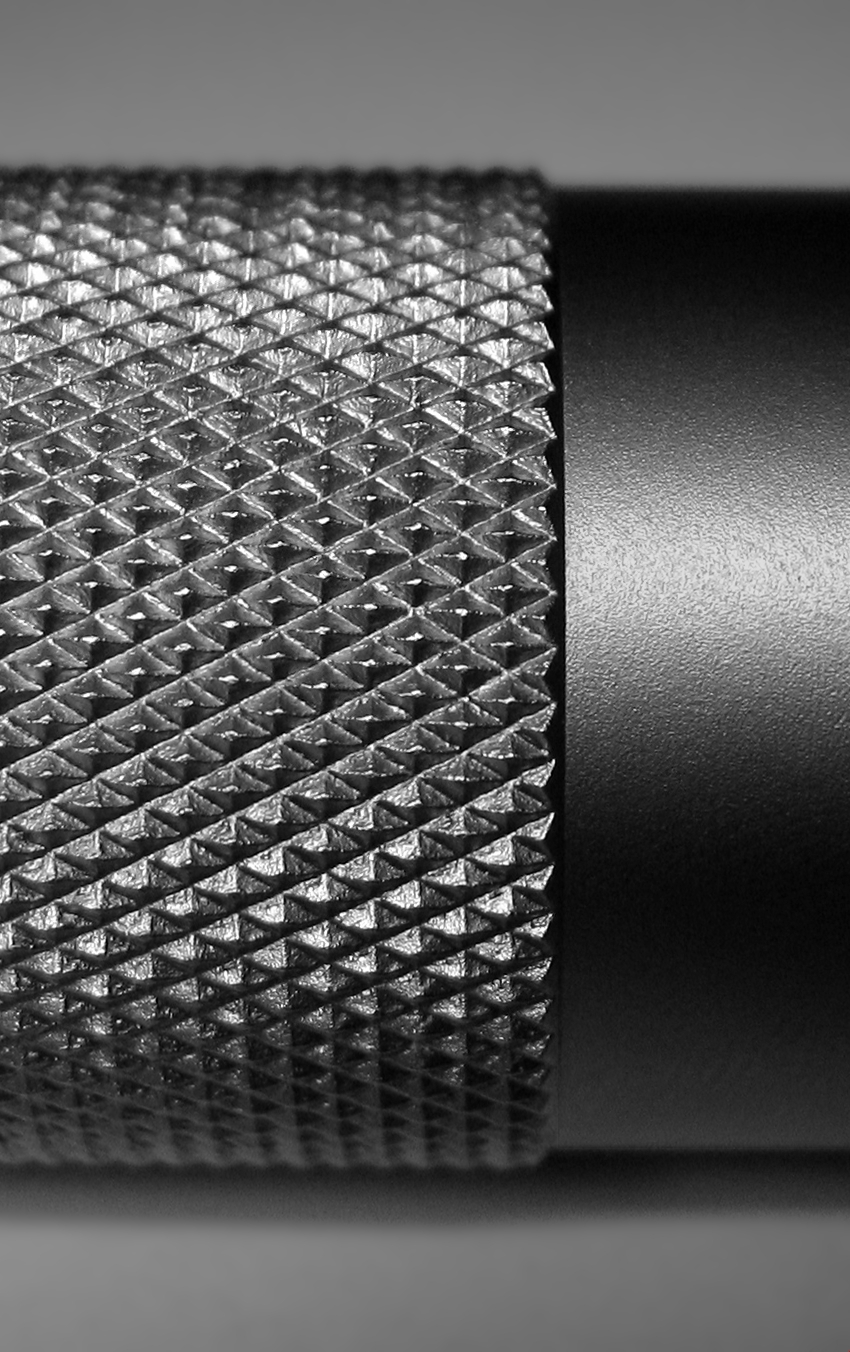
Close-up shot of a diamond-pattern knurling on a cylindrical work piece. Knurling method: left/right with tips raised, spiral angle: 30°, pitch: 1 mm, profile angle: 90°

Knurling is a manufacturing process, typically conducted on a lathe, whereby a pattern of straight, angled or crossed lines is rolled into the material. Knurling can also refer to material that has a knurled pattern, or the pattern itself.

== Etymology ==
The terms knurl and knurled are from an earlier knur ‘knot in wood’ and the diminutive -le, from Middle English knaur or knarre ‘knot in wood; twisted rock; crag’. This descends from Old English cnearra but the vowel in Middle English may have been influenced by Old Norse knǫrr ‘merchant ship’ which was known as cnearr in Old English. The modern gnarl is a back-formation of gnarled which itself is first attested in Shakespeare's works and is apparently a variant of knurled.

== Uses ==
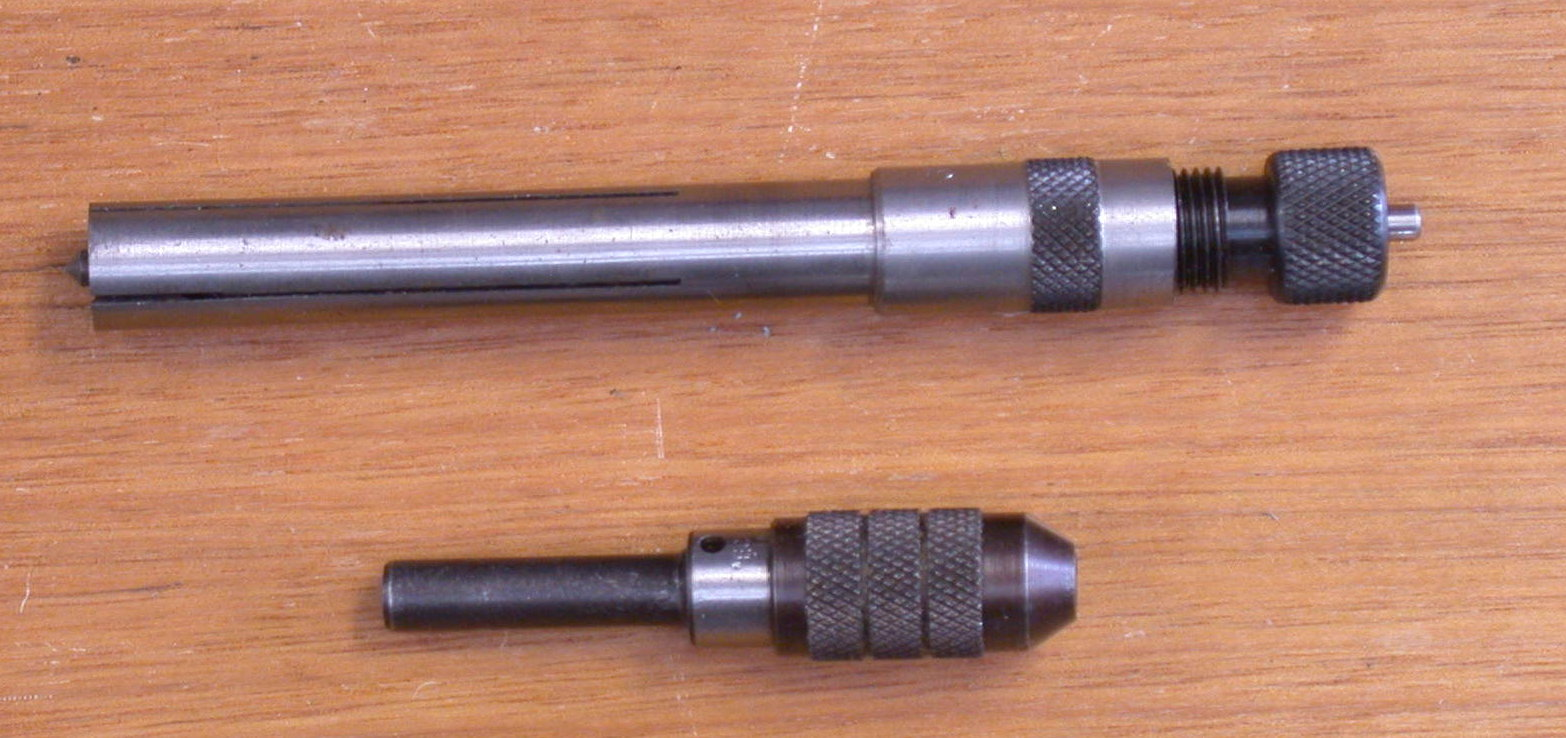
Two examples of the use of knurling in hand tools

Knurling produces indentations on a part of a workpiece, allowing hands or fingers to get a better grip on the knurled object than would be provided by the original smooth surface. Occasionally, the knurled pattern is a series of straight ridges or a helix of "straight" ridges rather than the more-usual criss-cross pattern.

Knurling may also be used as a repair method: because a rolled-in knurled surface has raised areas surrounding the depressed areas, these raised areas can make up for wear on the part. In the days when labor was cheap and parts expensive, this repair method was feasible on pistons of internal combustion engines, where the skirt of a worn piston was expanded to the nominal size using a knurling process. As auto parts have become less expensive, knurling has become less prevalent than it once was, and is specifically discouraged by the builders of performance engines.

Knurling can also be used when a component will be assembled into a low-precision component, for example a metal pin into a plastic molding. The outer surface of the metal pin is knurled so that the raised detail "bites" into the plastic even if the size of the hole in the plastic doesn't closely match the diameter of the pin.

Tool handles, mechanical pencils, the grips of pistols, barbell bars, the clamping surface of a motorcycle handlebar and the control knobs on electronic equipment are frequently knurled. Knurling is also used on the grips of darts and on the footpegs of BMX bicycles. Knurling is also found in many surgical instruments, where it is used for instrument identification, and for its ease of being brushed clean.

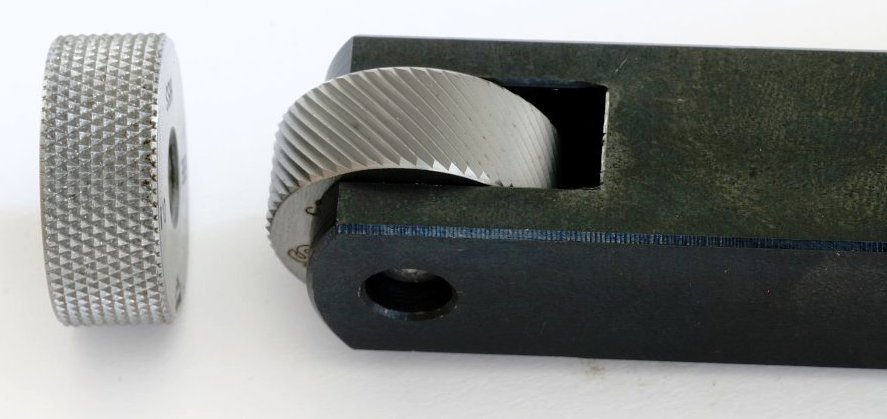
A single-wheel knurling tool

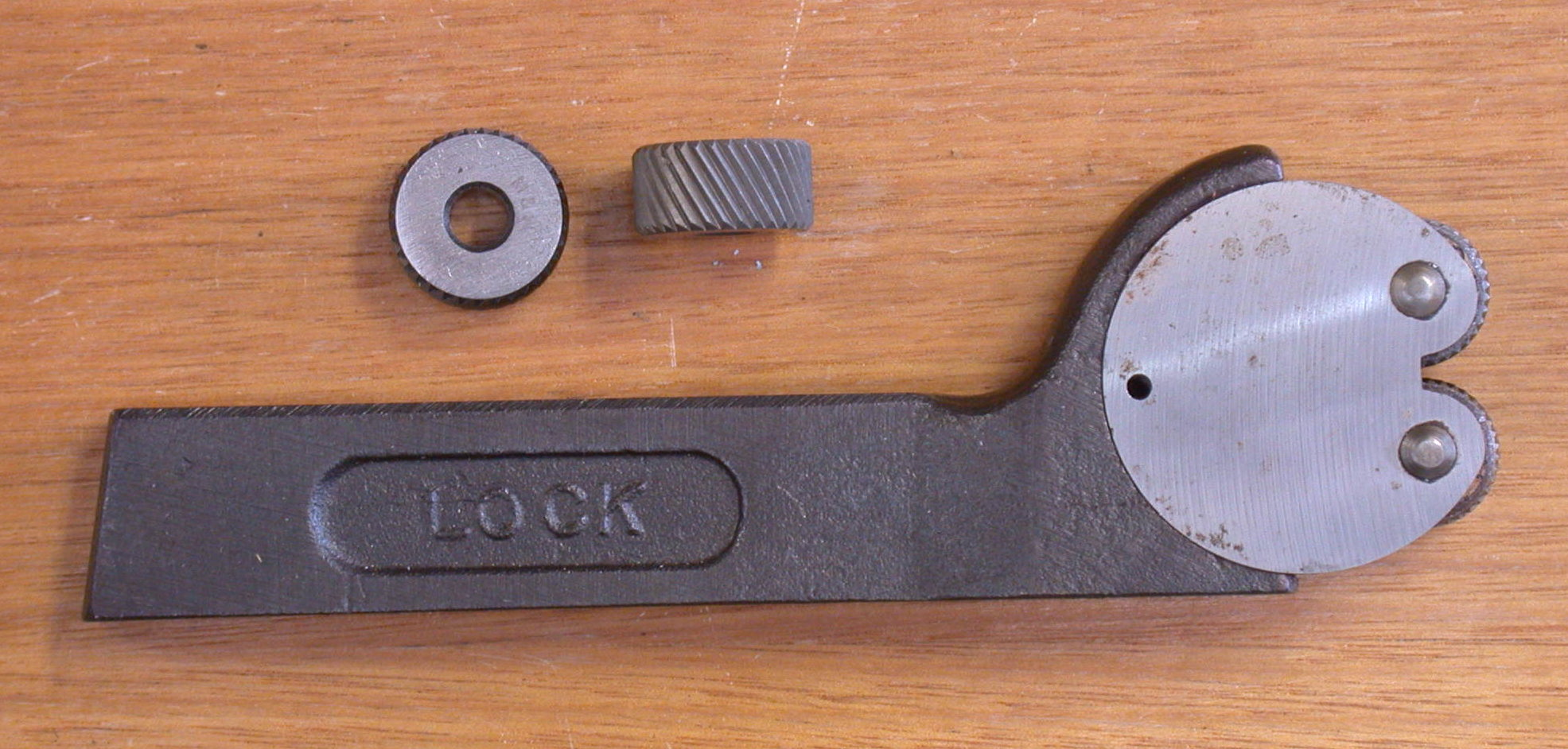
A diamond knurling tool with two of the interchangeable rollers shown above it

== Types ==
Annular rings
Frequently used when the mating part is plastic. Rings allow for easy mating but ridges make it difficult to pull the components apart.
Linear knurl
Used with mating plastic pieces, the linear knurl allows greater torsion between components.
Diamond knurl or spiral knurl
A hybrid of annular rings and linear knurling in which a diamond shape is formed. It is used to provide better grip on components, and is the most common type used on everyday objects.
Straight knurling
Grooves cut parallel to the rotation axis.

== Bibliography ==
- Barnhart, Robert K., ed. (1988). Barnhart Dictionary of Etymology (1st ed.). Bronx, New York: The H. W. Wilson Company. p. 569. ISBN 0824207459.
