= Daya =

Daya may refer to:

== Religion ==
- Daya (Sikhism), the concept of compassion in Sikhism
- Daya (virtue), the concept of compassion in Hinduism

== Media and music ==
- Daya (film), a 1998 Indian Malayalam-language film
- Daya (EP), a 2015 recording by the American singer Daya
- Daya (TV series), an Indian Malayalam-language TV series starring Pallavi Gowda

== Places ==
- Daya, Zanzibar, a village on the island of Pemba
- Daya Kingdom, a historic Sumatran kingdom conquered by Ali Mughayat Syah in the 16th century, located in northern Aceh
- Daya Bay, on the south coast of Guangdong Province, China
- Daya, Taichung, a suburban district in Taichung, Taiwan
- Daya Nueva, a municipality in Alicante Province, Valencian Community, Spain
- Daya River, in Odisha, India
- Daya Vieja, a municipality in Alicante Province, Valencian Community, Spain

== People ==
=== Given name ===
- Daya (singer) (born 1998), American singer-songwriter
- Daiaphi Lamare, better known as Daya or Reble, an Indian rapper and songwriter
- Daya Bai, Indian social activist
- Daya Betty, American drag queen
- Daya Singh Bedi (1899–1975), Indian diplomat and officer in the British Indian Army
- Daya Ram Dahal, Nepalese film director
- Daya Gamage, Sri Lankan politician and businessman
- Daya Kishore Hazra, Indian doctor
- Daya Bir Singh Kansakar (1911–2001), Nepalese social worker
- Daya Krishna (1924–2007), Indian philosopher
- Daya Master (born 1956), Sri Lankan Tamil media spokesman
- Daya Mata (1914–2010), American spiritual teacher and leader
- Daya Rajasinghe Nadarajasingham (born 1948), Sri Lankan sports shooter
- Daya Shankar Kaul Nasim (1811–1845), Indian Urdu-language poet
- Daya Nayak, Indian police officer
- Daya Shankar Pandey (born 1965), Indian film and television actor
- Daya Pathirana (died 1986), assassinated Sri Lankan student leader
- Daya Pawar (1935–1996), Indian author and poet
- Daya Perera (died 2013), Sri Lankan diplomat and lawyer
- Daya Ratnasooriya, Sri Lankan zoologist
- Daya Ratnayake, Sri Lankan Army commander
- B. S. Daya Sagar (born 1967), Indian mathematical geoscientist
- Daya Ram Sahni (1879–1939), Indian archaeologist
- Daya Sandagiri, Sri Lankan Navy commander
- Daya Shankar (cricketer), Indian cricketer who played 1943–44
- Daya Shankar (IRS officer), officer of the Indian Revenue Service
- Daya Shetty (born 1969), Indian model and actor
- Daya Singh (1661–1708), one of the first five Sikhs in the Khalsa order
- Daya Singh Sodhi (born 1925), Indian politician
- Daya Vaidya (born 1980), Nepalese-American actress
- Daya Vati, mother of the fourth Sikh guru Ram Das
- Daya-Nand Verma (1933–2012), Indian mathematician
- Daya Wiffen (born 1983), New Zealand netball player
- Daya, courtesy name for Shi Hong (313–334), Chinese emperor of Later Zhao

=== Surname ===
- Ahmad ibn Yusuf ibn al-Daya (835–912), Arab mathematician
- Ali Daya (fl. 1030–1040), Tajik commander
- Houda Ben Daya (born 1979), Tunisian judoka
- Hugo Daya (born 1963), Colombian cyclist
- Kawkab Sabah al-Daya (born 1962), Syrian environmental minister
- Navasha Daya, vocalist and original member of American band Fertile Ground
- Pradnya Daya Pawar (born 1966), Indian Marathi-language poet and writer
- Wen Daya, 7th-century Chinese writer who recorded the Battle of Huoyi in detail

=== Fictional ===
- Datu Daya, a legendary tribal chief in the Philippines
- Daya (Senior Inspector), a character in the Indian TV series CID
- Daya Diaz, a character on the American TV series Orange Is the New Black

== Other ==
- Daya, a 2016 tropical storm in the Indian Ocean
- Daya Aviation, a domestic Sri Lankan airline
- Daya, nickname for the Israeli Air Force 192 Squadron

== See also ==
- Dayah, a settlement in Ras al-Khaimah, United Arab Emirates
- Taya (disambiguation)
