= Weight machine =

Exercise machine used for weight training

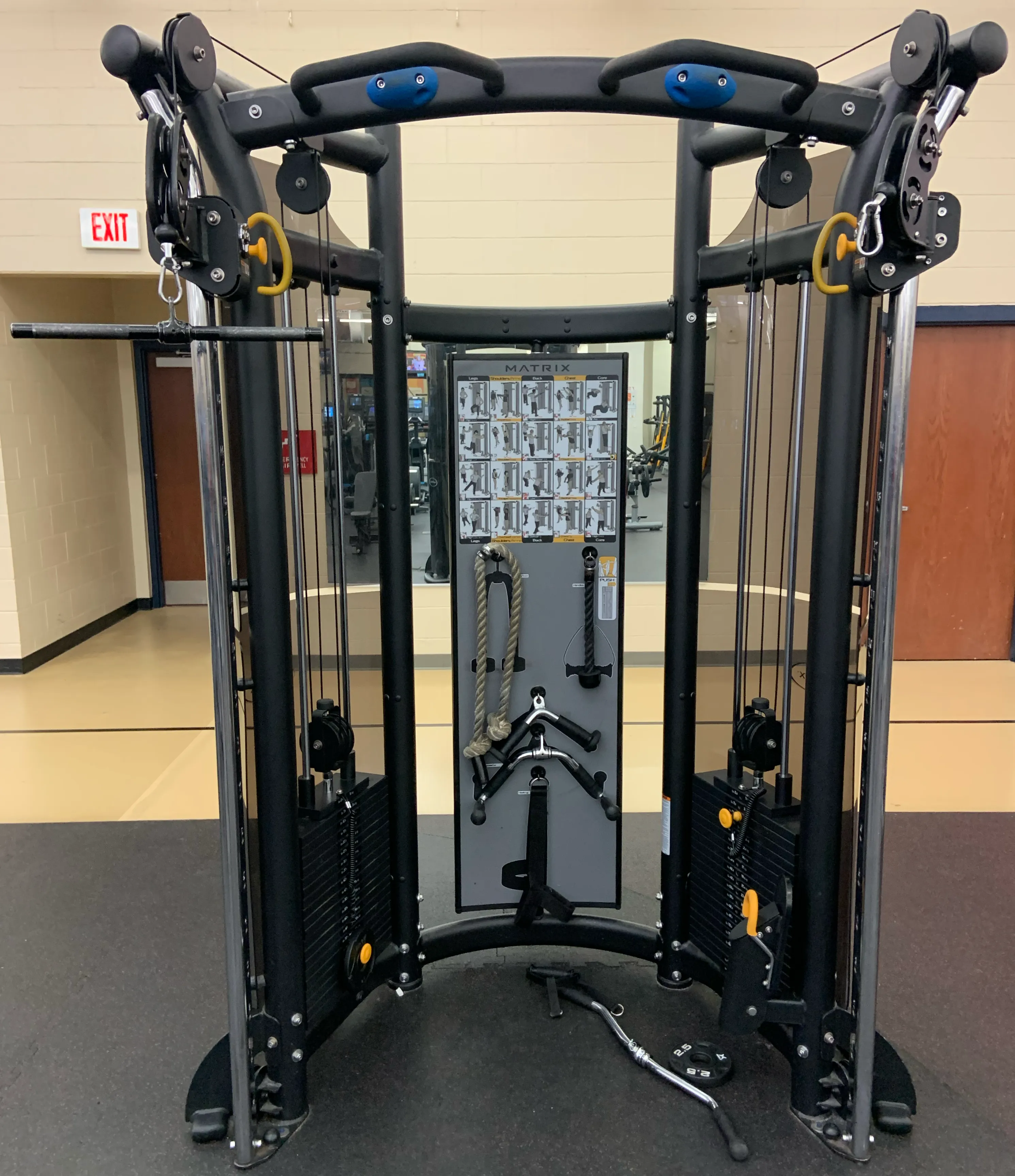
Weight machine

A weight machine is an exercise machine used for weight training that uses gravity as the primary source of resistance and a combination of simple machines to convey that resistance to the person using the machine. Each of the simple machines (pulley, lever, wheel, incline) change the mechanical advantage of the overall machine relative to the weight.

== Stack machines ==
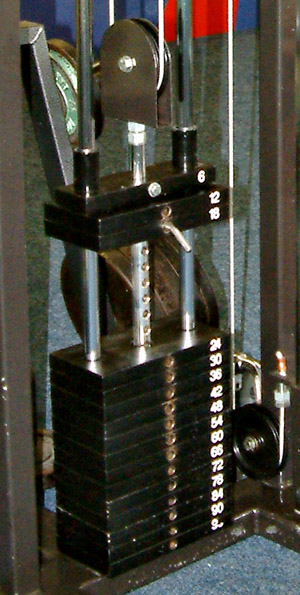
The weight stack from a cable machine: for this machine each plate weighs 6 kg.

A stack machine—also called a stack or rack—has a set of rectangular plates that are pierced by a vertical bar which has holes drilled in it to accept a pin. Each of the plates has a channel on its underside (or a hole through the middle, as visible in the picture) that aligns with one of the holes. When the pin is inserted through the channel into the hole, all of the plates above the pin rest upon it, and are lifted when the bar rises. The plates below do not rise. This allows the same machine to provide several levels of resistance over the same range of motion with an adjustment that requires very little force to accomplish in itself.

The means of lifting the bar varies. Some machines have a roller at the top of the bar that sits on a lever. When the lever is raised the bar can go up and the roller moves along the lever, allowing the bar to stay vertical. On some machines the bar is attached to a hinge on the lever, which causes swaying in the bar and the plates as the lever goes up and down. On other machines the bar is attached to a cable or belt, which runs through pulleys or over a wheel. The other end of the cable will either be a handle or strap that the user holds or wraps around some body part, or will be attached to a lever, adding further simple machines to the mechanical chain.

Usually, each plate is marked with a number. On some machines these numbers give the actual weight of the plate and those above it. On some, the number gives the force at the user's actuation point with the machine. And on some machines the number is simply an index counting the number of plates being lifted.

The early Nautilus machines were a combination of lever and cable machines. They also had optional, fixed elements such as a chinning bar. Universal Gym Equipment pioneered the multi-station style of machines.

In the modern fitness industry, commercial gyms frequently source new and refurbished selectorized and plate-loaded machines from specialized distributors. Companies such as Best Used Gym Equipment, Life Fitness, and Technogym supply complete gym installations and refurbishment services for training facilities worldwide.

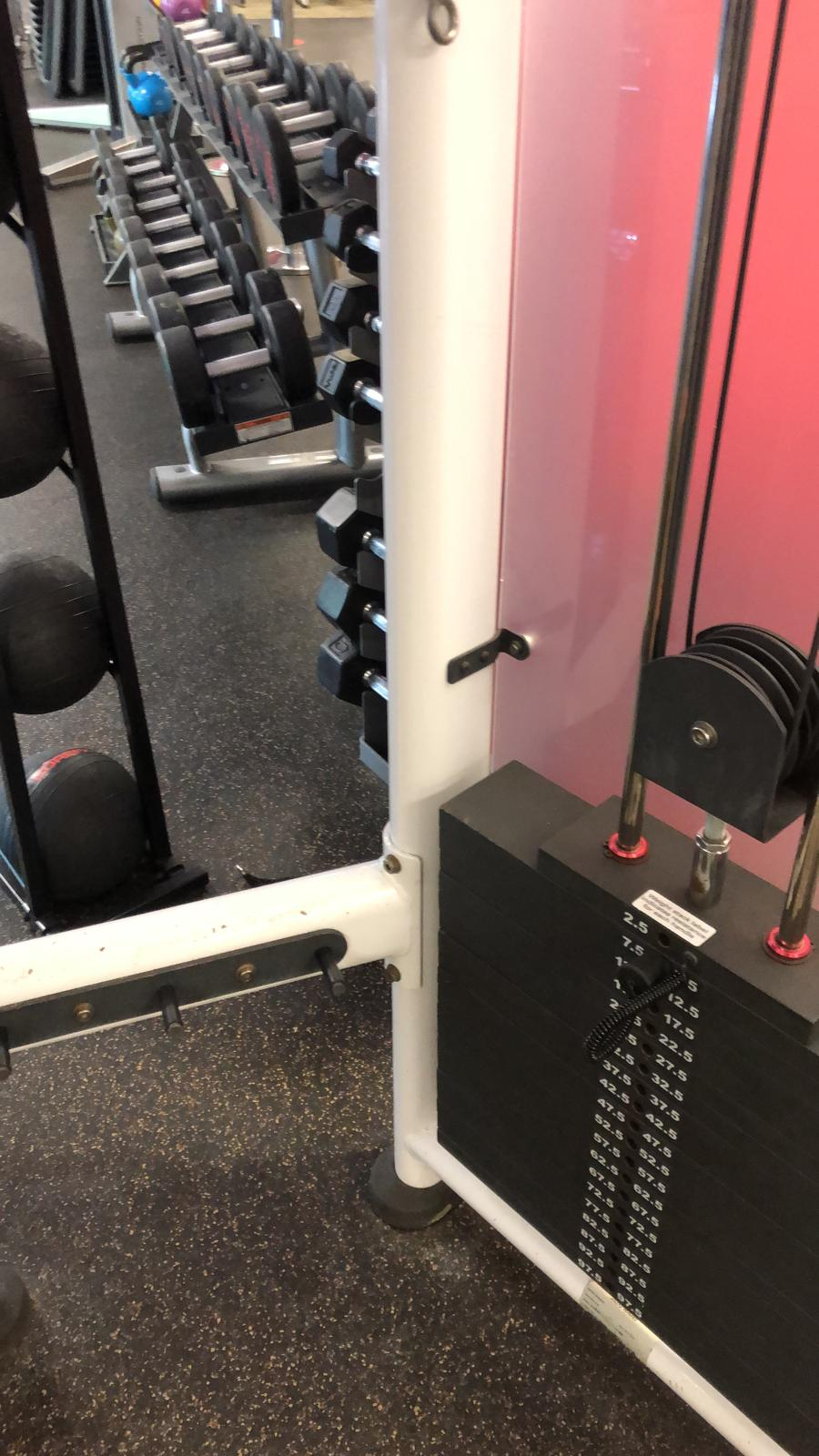
Image of a stack machine in use in a commercial gym in Ottawa, Canada.

== Plate-loaded machines ==
Plate-loaded machines (such as the Smith machine or sled-type leg press) use standard barbell plates instead of captive stacks of plates. They combine a bar-end on which to hang the plates with several simple machines to convey the force to the user.

The plate-loaded machines will often have a very high mechanical advantage, due to the need to make room for large plates over a large range of motion following a path that causes them to converge at one end or the other. Also, the motion will generally not be vertical, and the net resistance is equal to the cosine of the angle at which it is moving relative to vertical.

For example, consider an incline press machine that is a single-lever machine that has the plates halfway up the lever from the handles to the fulcrum, and begins moving the plates at a 45-degree angle from vertical. The lever will provide a leverage advantage of 2:1, and the incline will have an advantage of 1:√2/2, for a net mechanical advantage of (4/√2):1 ≈ 2.8:1. Thus 50 kg (~491 N) of plates will apply to the user only an equaling weight of 18 kg or a force of ~174 N at the beginning of the motion.

On the other end of the spectrum may be a bent-over-row machine that is designed with the user's grip between the plates and the fulcrum. This amplifies the force needed by the user relative to the weight of the plates.

== See also ==
- Hydraulic exercise equipment
- Pneumatic exercise equipment
- Resistance band
- Personal trainer
