= Zinkin =

Zinkin is a surname. It may be a matronymic surname of Eastern Ashkenazi Jewish origin meaning "son of Zinka", the latter being an East Slavic belittling form of the diminutive Zina of the female given name Zinaida. Notable people with the surname include:

- Harold Zinkin, founder of Universal Gym Equipment
- Louis Zinkin (1925-1993), British analytical psychologist
- Taya Zinkin (1918-2003), English journalist and author
