= Face pull (exercise) =

Weight training exercise

The face pull is a weight training exercise that primarily targets the musculature of the upper back and shoulders, namely the posterior deltoids, trapezius, rhomboids, Latissimus dorsi as well as the biceps. The face pull is considered an important exercise for shoulder health and stability.

== Biomechanics ==
At the glenohumeral joint, movement of the humerus is performed by a combination of transverse abduction, by the posterior and lateral deltoids, and external rotation, by the infraspinatus and teres minor. At the scapulothoracic joint, the middle and lower fibers of the trapezius and the rhomboids contract to perform retraction of the scapulae. To a lesser extent, the biceps are involved to flex the elbow joint, while the spine erectors isometrically stabilize the lower back.

== Performance ==
The face pull is often performed standing using a cable machine and rope attachment, with the subject rowing the rope attachment towards the face, with the elbows flared outwards. The exercise can, however, also be performed seated or with resistance bands.
