= Functional training =

Classification of exercise

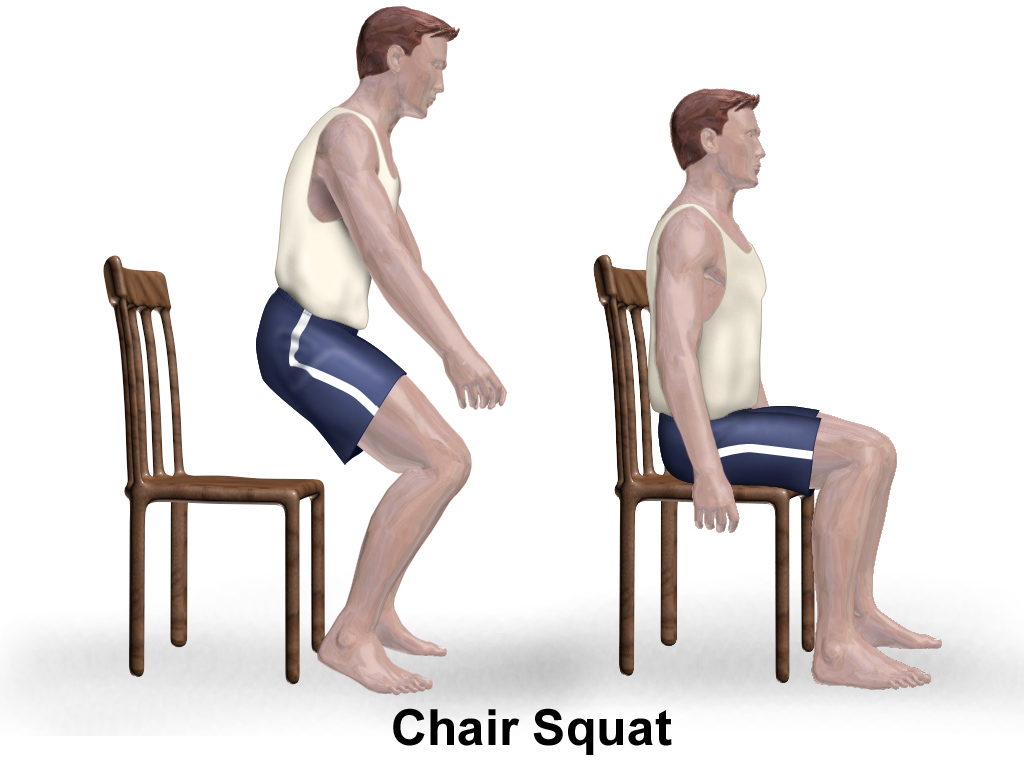
Illustration of chair squat.

Functional training, also known as functional fitness, is a classification of exercise which involves training the body for the activities performed in daily life.

== Functional strength training ==
Functional strength training is a fitness approach designed to enhance the body's ability to perform everyday movements with ease and efficiency. Unlike traditional strength training that isolates specific muscle groups, functional training focuses on exercises that mimic real-life activities, such as lifting, squatting, and climbing. By engaging multiple muscles and joints simultaneously, functional strength training aims to improve overall body coordination, stability, and strength. Core exercises like squats, lunges, push-ups, and planks are commonly used, as well as tools like kettlebells, resistance bands, and medicine balls.

Functional strength training is highly beneficial for improving daily life performance, reducing the risk of injury, and increasing flexibility and balance. It also provides a time-efficient workout by targeting multiple muscle groups at once, making it ideal for individuals seeking practical fitness solutions. This form of training is accessible to all fitness levels, from beginners to athletes, and can be adapted with bodyweight or added resistance, offering a comprehensive way to enhance functional fitness and overall health.

== Origins ==
Functional training has its origins in rehabilitation. Physical and occupational therapists and chiropractors often use this approach to retrain patients with movement disorders. Interventions are designed to incorporate task and context-specific practice in areas meaningful to each patient, with an overall goal of functional independence. For example, exercises that mimic what patients did at home or work may be included in treatment in order to help them return to their lives or jobs after an injury or surgery. Thus if a patient's job required repeatedly heavy lifting, rehabilitation would be targeted towards heavy lifting, if the patient were a parent of young children, it would be targeted towards moderate lifting and endurance, and if the patient were a marathon runner, training would be targeted towards re-building endurance. However, treatments are designed after careful consideration of the patient's condition, what he or she would like to achieve, and ensuring the goals of treatment are realistic and achievable.

The goal of functional training is to modify or create workouts that make it easier and without injuries for people to carry out daily tasks. When more muscles are utilized during a functional training activity, the body uses more oxygen—roughly one liter for every five calories of energy burned.

In the context of bodybuilding, functional training involves mainly weight bearing activities targeted at the core muscles of the abdomen and lower back. Fabio Martella wrote that most fitness facilities have a variety of weight training machines that target and isolate specific muscles. As a result, the movements do not necessarily bear any relationship to the movements people make in their regular activities or sports.

In rehabilitation, training does not necessarily have to involve weight-bearing activities but can target any task or a combination of tasks that a patient is having difficulty with. Balance training, for example, is often incorporated into a patient's treatment plan if it has been impaired after injury or disease.

== Evidence ==
Rehabilitation after stroke has evolved over the past 15 years from conventional treatment techniques to task specific training techniques which involve training of basic functions, skills and endurance (muscular and cardiovascular). Functional training has been well supported in evidence-based research for rehabilitation of this population. It has been shown that task specific training yields long-lasting cortical reorganization which is specific to the areas of the brain being used with each task. Studies have also shown that patients make larger gains in functional tasks used in their rehabilitation and since they are more likely to continue practicing these tasks in everyday living, better results during follow-up are obtained.

== Equipment ==
Some options include:

- Clubbells
- Macebells
- Cable machines
- Barbells
- Dumbbells
- Medicine balls
- Kettlebells
- Bodyweight training
- Physioballs (also called Swiss balls or exercise balls)
- Resistance bands
- Rocker and wobble boards
- Whole Body Vibration equipment (also called WBV or Acceleration Training)
- Balance disks
- Sandbags
- Suspension system
- Slideboard
- Redcord
- Ropes

In rehabilitation however, equipment is mainly chosen by its relevance to the patient. In many cases equipment needs are minimal and include things that are familiar and useful to the patient.

=== Cable machines ===
When creating a piece of Universal Gym Equipment in the 1950s, Harold Zinkin improved Jack LaLanne's invention of the cable machine. Cable machines, also known as pulley machines, are large upright machines, either with a single pulley, or else a pulley attached to both sides. They allow an athlete to recruit all major muscle groups while moving in multiple planes. Cable machines also provide a smooth, continuous action which reduces the need for momentum to start repetitions, provide a constant tension on the muscle, peak-contraction is possible at the top of each rep, a safe means of performing negative repetitions, and a variety of attachments that allow great flexibility in the exercises performed and body parts targeted.

== Components of a functional exercise program ==
To be effective, a functional exercise program should include a number of different elements which can be adapted to an individual's needs or goals:

- Based on functional tasks directed toward everyday life activities.
- Individualized – a training program should be tailored to each individual. Any program must be specific to the goals of an individual, focusing on meaningful tasks. It must also be specific to the individual state of health, including presence or history of injury. An assessment should be performed to help guide exercise selection and training load.
- Integrated – It should include a variety of exercises that work on flexibility, core, balance, strength and power, focusing on multiple movement planes.
- Progressive – Progressive training steadily increases the difficulty of the task.
- Periodized – mainly by training with distributed practice and varying the tasks.
- Repeated frequently.
- Use of real life object manipulation.
- Performed in context-specific environments.
- Feedback should be incorporated following performance (self-feedback of success is used as well as trainer/therapist feedback).
