= Taya =

Taya is a given name and surname, and may refer to:

== Surname ==
- Maaouya Ould Sid'Ahmed Taya, Mauritanian Leader
- Omar Katzelma Taya, a candidate in the 1993 Nigerien Presidential election

== Given name ==
- Taya Hanson (born 2000), Canadian basketball player
- Taya Renae Kyle, widow of Chris Kyle
- Taya Parker (born 1978), American model and actress
- Taya Perry, member of Homemade Jamz Blues Band
- Taya Rikizo, Asakusa Opera singer and influence of Kenichi Enomoto
- Taya Smith Gaukrodger, Australian singer and former member of Australian worship band Hillsong UNITED
- Taya Straton (1960–1996), Australian actress
- Taya Valkyrie (born 1983), Canadian professional wrestler
- Taya Zinkin (1918–2003), English journalist and author

== Places ==
- Taya, Algeria
- Taya, Kalewa, Burma

== Other ==
- Taya Station, a railway station in Tokoname, Aichi Prefecture, Japan
- Taya (Luo for "The Light"), a nickname for Kenyan association football club Gor Mahia
- Tell Taya, an archaeological site in Nineveh Province, Iraq
- Taya (2021 film), a Philippine erotic action thriller film
- Taya (2022 film), an Indian Sanskrit-language period drama film

== See also ==
- Daya (disambiguation)
- Taia (disambiguation)
- Thaya, a river in Central Europe
- Tiye (14th century BC), also spelled Taia, Tiy and Tiyi, wife of Egyptian pharaoh Amenhotep III
