= Ergometer =

Ergometer may refer to:

- Exercise machine, equipped with an apparatus for measuring the work performed by exercising
- Indoor rower, called an ergometer by rowers
- An instrument for measuring the amount of work done by human muscles

Ergometer comes from the Greek words ergon (ἔργον), meaning work, and metron (μέτρον), meaning measure. "Ergometer", therefore, literally means "work measurer". A bike, fitted with mechanical work measurement devices is also an ergometer.

== See also ==
- Erg (unit), the unit of energy and mechanical work in the centimetre-gram-second system
- Dynamometer, a machine used to measure force or mechanical power
