= Wiffen =

Wiffen is a surname. Notable people with the name include:

- Benjamin Barron Wiffen (1794–1867), English Quaker businessman, bibliophile and biographer
- Daniel Wiffen (born 2001), Irish swimmer
- David Wiffen (1942–2026), Canadian singer-songwriter
- Daya Wiffen (born 1983), Danish netball player
- Jeremiah Holmes Wiffen (1792–1836), English poet and writer, brother of Benjamin Barron Wiffen
- Joan Wiffen (1922–2009), New Zealand amateur paleontologist
- Valerie Wiffen (born 1943), British artist

== See also ==
- Whiffen, a surname
