= 1950 East Pakistan riots =

Riots in East Bengal

1950 East Bengal riots
- Syama Prasad Mukherjee talking to Bengali Hindu refugees at a refugee camp in Dhubulia, West Bengal
- Date: February–March 1950
- Target: Bengali Hindus, Santhals, Khasi, Rakhine, Chakma, Tripuri, Marma
- Attack type: Massacre, forced conversion, plunder, arson, abduction, rape
- Deaths: Thousands
- Perpetrators: Ansars, East Bengal Regiment, Bengali Muslims

The 1950 East Pakistan riots (Bengali: পঞ্চাশের পূর্ব পাকিস্তান দাঙ্গা, Urdu: پچاس کی دہائی کے مشرقی پاکستان کے فسادات) was a series of state-sponsored persecutions that took place against Hindus in East Pakistan by Muslims of East Pakistan, resulting in thousands being killed in pogroms.

== Background ==
In August 1947, British India was partitioned into the Dominions of India and Pakistan on the basis of religion. Pakistan was to become the homeland for the Muslims of former British India with a majority Muslim population. The province of Bengal, with a marginal Muslim majority, was also partitioned, with the Muslim-majority East Bengal going to Pakistan and Hindu-majority West Bengal going to India. The Sylhet District of Assam was added to East Bengal after the Sylhet referendum, where the majority voted for Pakistan. According to the 1941 census, East Bengal had a 28% non-Muslim population, the majority of them being Bengali Hindus. West Bengal had a 30.2% Muslim population; the rest were Hindus.

The area comprising East Bengal, especially the Dhaka and Chittagong Divisions, had witnessed numerous instances of ethnic violence in the decades preceding the Partition. In the 1940s, the frequency and intensity of the riots increased as the movement for Pakistan gained momentum. In the last quarter of 1946, the Bengali Hindus of Noakhali and Tippera districts were subjected to a series of massacres, looting, arson, rape, and abduction. Forced conversions to Islam occurred, and the events came to be known as the Noakhali riots.

Within a month of the Partition, the Janmashtami procession was attacked in Dhaka. In 1948, the Dhamrai Rathyatra and the Janmashtami procession were not allowed to be held. In 1949, there were posters all over Dhaka against the Durga Puja. The number of community pujas was drastically reduced. On the day of Vijayadashami, hundreds of Hindu households were set on fire, leaving around 750 Hindu families homeless. Santosh Chatterjee, a Press Trust of India (PTI) correspondent, was imprisoned on 25 November 1949 without charges and released after a month.

== Atrocities (August 1949 – January 1950) ==
In August 1949, atrocities against non-Muslims began all over East Pakistan and continued for three months. In August, Muslim mobs, along with the police and the Ansars, attacked some Hindu villages in the Beanibazar and Barlekha police station areas of Sylhet District. Houses were looted, destroyed, and set on fire. Hindu villagers were assaulted and murdered. Hindu women were raped by police. Soon after, Hindus were attacked in the village of Bhandaria in Barisal District. In Rajshahi District, Father Thomas Cattaneo reported that Santal villages were attacked, Santal villagers were arrested, and Santal women were raped. On 10 December, a Muslim mob attacked the Puthia Rajbari Palace in Rajshahi Division and forcibly took possession of the house and its treasures.

=== Kalshira massacre ===
On 20 December 1949, four police constables raided the house of one Joydev Brahma in the village of Kalshira, under the Mollahat police station in the Bagerhat subdivision of Khulna District, late at night, in search of suspected communists. Having failed to find any suspects, the constables tried to rape Brahma's wife. Her cry alerted him and his companions, who, in a desperate bid to save her, attacked two constables, one of whom died on the spot. The remaining two raised an alarm and neighbors came to their rescue.

The next day, the District Superintendent of Police arrived in Kalshira accompanied by an armed police contingent and Ansars and attacked Kalshira and other neighbouring Hindu villages mercilessly. They encouraged Muslims from neighbouring villages to loot Hindu properties. A number of Hindus were killed, and men and women were forcibly converted. Images were broken and shrines were desecrated. All 350 homesteads in the village, except three, were demolished. Cattle and boats were forcibly taken away. Within a month of the massacre, 30,000 Hindus fled from Khulna to India.

=== Nachole massacre ===
Nachole was a police station in the Nawabganj subdivision of Rajshahi district. During the Partition of India, the entire Nawabganj subdivision was transferred from Malda district, which went to India, to Rajshahi district, which fell in Pakistan. The area under the Nachole police station had a non-Muslim majority. It was inhabited by Santals and Bengali Hindu castes like the Kshatriyas, Bhuindas, and Kaibartas. After partition, the Tebhaga Movement was brutally suppressed in the newly formed state of Pakistan. However, in Nachole, the movement was still alive through the covert activities of leaders operating from underground. From the autumn of 1949, the leaders began to succeed in implementing Tebhaga principles through persuasion, coercion, and, in some cases, force.

On 5 January 1950, five policemen from the Nachole police station were killed by Santals in Chandipur village after they opened fire to disperse villagers who had gathered to protest the arrest of one of the villagers. The Government of Pakistan responded to this incident by sending a 2,000-strong army contingent and police and Ansars on 7 January. They set fire to twelve villages, ransacked huts, and killed many villagers on their way to Chandipur. In Chandipur, they tortured men, raped women, and set fire to dwellings. Hundreds of Santals and Hindus were killed. At Rohanpur, Ila Mitra, one of the movement leaders, was arrested with hundreds of peasants. After being taken to the Nachole police station, they were tortured by police to extract the names of the leaders. Around 70 to 100 peasants died of police excesses. Ila Mitra was tortured and raped for four days before being transferred to the Nawabganj police station.

== Prelude ==
In the Feni subdivision of Noakhali, Hindus were attacked on 2 February, even before the attacks had actually broken out in Dhaka. One Hindu was killed and seven were injured. Nine Hindu shops were looted.

== Killings ==
Locations: – Site of railway massacres

=== Dhaka District ===
In February 1950, Sukumar Sen, the Chief Secretary of West Bengal, had travelled to Dhaka to hold a Chief Secretary-level dialogue with his East Bengal counterpart Aziz Ahmed. On 10 February, at around 10:00 am, when the talks were in progress, a Muslim woman in bloodstained clothes was paraded in the Secretariat building. It was alleged that she had been raped in Kolkata. The Secretariat employees immediately struck work and started a procession shouting anti-Hindu slogans. As they progressed towards Nawabpur, many others joined the procession, which ended at Victoria Park. At 12:00 noon, a rally was held at the park where the speakers, some of the employees of the Secretariat, made fierce anti-Hindu speeches. At around 1:00 pm, as soon as the rally broke, the crowd began to loot Hindu shops and houses and set them on fire. Hindus were killed wherever they were found. By the evening, 90% of Hindu shops in Dhaka were looted, and many burnt. Hindu jewellery shops were looted in the presence of police officers. An estimated 50,000 Hindus were displaced in seven hours of murder, looting, and arson. According to PTI reports, the worst affected areas were Banagram and Makims Lane. Most of the houses in the two predominantly Hindu localities were completely looted, many completely burnt down, and places of worship desecrated. Tajuddin Ahmed, who travelled in different parts of Dhaka between 1:00 pm and 6:00 pm, acknowledged the destruction and loss inflicted on Hindus by Muslims in the localities of Nawabpur, Sadarghat, Patuatuli, Islampur, Digbazar, English Road, Bangshal, and Chowk Bazaar. On the afternoon of 12 February, 60 India-bound Hindu passengers were attacked at Kurmitola airport. All non-Muslim passengers arriving at Tejgaon Airport were stabbed. Three days after the massacre started in Dhaka, the villages of Vikrampur and Lohajang were attacked. On 15 February, the Simulia market was set on fire, and Hindu shops were looted. Between 15 February and 1 March, there were 15 stabbings of Hindus reported from Dighali and Lohajang. On 28 February, the Dighali market was burnt down; Hindu shops were gutted. In Parulla village under the Kaliganj police station, all Hindu houses were looted. All Hindu houses in the villages of Khsawala, Gazaria, Karar Char, Char Sindur, Palas, and Sadhar Char were looted. According to Indian government sources, the bodies of 200 Hindu victims were cremated in the first two days of violence. They also claimed that 50,000 out of Dhaka's 80,000 Hindus had to flee their homes during the attacks. On 24 February 1950, the US ambassador to India wrote to the US Secretary of State that between 600 and 1,000 Hindus were killed and thousands injured in the Dhaka area.

=== Barisal District ===
In Barisal, riots started on 13 February. Hindus were killed, raped, and abducted indiscriminately. According to the press note of the Government of East Bengal, two unidentified youths began to spread provocative rumours on the afternoon of 13 February in the town of Barisal. As a result, many of the shops in the market closed down. Another rumour was spread that Fazlul Haque had been murdered in Kolkata. At nightfall, eight places were set on fire. Thirty houses and shops were reduced to ashes, and ten persons were severely burnt. The situation further deteriorated after 16 February when indiscriminate looting and arson of Hindu properties started in Gournadi, Jhalakati, and Nalchiti under the Sadar subdivision of Barisal District. Hindu passengers on the water route between Barisal and Dhaka were killed within the steamer and thrown in the river.

In the river port of Muladi in Barisal District, several hundred Hindus took shelter in the police station after their homes were torched. They were later attacked within the police station compound, and most of them were killed within the precincts of the police station. A Hindu school teacher was roasted alive by his Muslim students, who danced around the fire. In the village of Madhabpasha, under Babugunge police station (presently Babuganj Upazila), two to three hundred Hindus were rounded up by a Muslim mob. They were made to squat in a row, and their heads were chopped off one by one with a ramda. In the Madhabpasha zamindar house, 200 Hindus were killed and 40 injured.

Ilsaghat is a steamer station on the Meghna, on the island of Bhola, 7 miles from Bhola town. It falls on the steamer route between Barisal and Chittagong. On 16 February 1950, the SS Sitakunda of the Royal Steam Navigation Company anchored at Ilsaghat on her way to Chittagong. At Ilsaghat, several Hindu passengers from SS We've Gone boarded SS Sitakunda due to atrocities perpetrated on them by the crew. Around 8:00 pm that night, hundreds of Muslims attacked SS Sitakunda while still anchored at the steamer station. They massacred the unarmed Hindu passengers and threw them into the river. Thirty Hindus were killed in the massacre, while three survived.

According to contemporary Muslim eyewitnesses, a few thousand Hindus were killed and about two thousand Hindus went missing from Barisal District alone. Researcher Subhasri Ghosh has put the number of Bengali Hindus killed in Barisal District at around 2,500. Documentary filmmaker Supriyo Sen estimated that as many as 650,000 Hindus attempted to flee from Barisal to India and on their way were looted, killed, and abducted.

=== Chittagong District ===
On 12 February, anti-Hindu riots started in Chittagong. The riots were instigated and organized by Fazlul Quader Chowdhury. At night the city went up in flames. Hindus were killed in Chittagong proper and adjoining areas such as Noapara, Chowdhury Hat, Patiya, Boalkhali, and Sitakunda. In one incident, almost all the Hindu passengers of a train were killed in Pahartali. The Hindu pilgrims who had assembled in Sitakunda on the occasion of Maha Shivaratri were attacked by Muslim mobs. Nellie Sengupta, member of East Bengal assembly from Chittagong, wrote to Liaquat Ali Khan, the Prime Minister of Pakistan, about the anti-Hindu riots in Chittagong.

In Chittagong District, four persons from the Buddhist community, including a police inspector, were stabbed, and monasteries were demolished. The residences of some Buddhist families in the Fatickchari police station area and that of a Buddhist zamindar in Lamburhat under the Rowjan police station were burnt to ashes. As a consequence, large numbers of Buddhist people migrated to the Lushai Hills in India.

After the pogroms, Prafulla Chandra Ghosh, the erstwhile Chief Minister of West Bengal, went to visit Chittagong. Sanjib Prasad Sen, a former anti-British revolutionary, took him on a tour of the affected areas. With help from former revolutionaries Binod Bihari Chowdhury and Birendra Lal Chowdhury, Sen prepared a list of persons killed in the riots.

=== Noakhali District ===
On 10 February, Hindus were attacked in Noakhali town. On the afternoon of 13 February, Hindus were attacked in broad daylight in Feni, within 200 yards of the SDO, the police station, and the courts. Hindu quarters of the town like Masterpara, Ukilpara, Daktarpara, Sahadebpur, Barahaipur, and Sultanpur were attacked, looted, and then set on fire. Gurudas Kar, an influential member of the Hindu community, was killed. After the destruction of the Hindu areas of Feni town, the violence spread to nearby villages under the Feni and Chhagalnaiya police stations, mainly inhabited by the Nath community. The villages of Banspara, Rampur, Madhupur, Srichandrapur, Basikpur, Chakbasta, Shibpur, and Baligaon were burnt to ashes. In the attacks, 45 Hindus were killed, 205 Hindu houses were burnt to ashes, and huge amounts of assets were looted.

Hindu women were abducted and forcibly married to Muslims. Harendra Kar's teenage daughter, Mila Kar, was forcibly married to Sultan Mian, a civil supply contractor, after her father, grandfather, and son were slaughtered. A married Hindu woman named Ranubala was forcibly married to Rahmat Ali, the son of Honorary Magistrate Barik Mian.

The attacks continued till 23 February, and by then, 4,500 Hindus had taken shelter at the refugee camp at Feni College. Another 2,500 were scattered in various refugee camps across the Noakhali district. Hindus who were trying to flee to the Indian state of Tripura were looted and assaulted on the way. Hindu women and children were held at the Chandpur and Akhaura railway stations. The Ansars, police, and Muslim mobs refused to allow them to flee to Agartala or Kolkata. According to an Amrita Bazar Patrika report, 5,000 Hindus fled to Belonia, in the Indian state of Tripura.

=== Sylhet District ===
In Sylhet, arson, looting, and massacre were perpetrated in an extensive manner. 203 villages were devastated and more than 800 Hindu religious places were desecrated. In the villages of Dhamai, Baradhami, Pubghat, and Baraitali about 500 Manipuri families were affected by the riots.

Ever since the Sylhet referendum, it was propagated that Hindus had voted against Pakistan and, therefore, they were enemies of Pakistan. On 6 February 1950, the verdict of the Bagge Tribunal was declared. The Muslims of Sylhet had anticipated that Karimganj would fall within Pakistan, but it was awarded to India. Some Muslim lawyers of the Sylhet Bar Association and Muslim mukhtars of Karimganj threatened that there would be terrible violence. On 10 February, a huge poster was hung at Bandar Bazar, the city centre of Sylhet. The poster, titled Atrocities on Mussulmans by Hindus in Hindusthan, depicted Muslims being dragged using ropes tied around their necks by Hindus armed with sticks and other weapons. Rivers of blood were flowing in Lumding and Kolkata because of Muslim killings. Local Muslims were poring over the poster and inciting fellow Muslims to take revenge on Hindus. On 11 February, at a rally at Gobinda Park, there was a cry for Hindu blood. It was rumoured that Fazlul Haque had been murdered in Kolkata. The situation deteriorated rapidly in Sylhet. On 13 February, Section 144 was imposed in Sylhet by the decision taken by the Chief Secretaries of East Bengal and West Bengal at Dhaka. A Hindu youth named Prithwish Das was stabbed at Zinda Bazar. On 14 February, a rumour spread that Muslims were being massacred at Karimganj. The Deputy Commissioner of Sylhet, addressing a meeting of lawyers, made an irresponsible statement that 5,000 Muslims were killed in Karimganj and that Muslims arrived in large numbers from Karimganj into Sylhet. In the evening, Moti Das, a Bengali Hindu youth, was killed near Jallapar. Three Manipuris were stabbed, two of whom died later.

On the afternoon of 14 February, the Namabazar market was looted by a Muslim mob. From the morning of 15 February, looting and murder began to spread in the villages. At 9:00 am, the village of Murti was attacked. Hundreds of outsider Muslims attacked the Dutta Senapati family, raising anti-Hindu slogans. They looted cash, jewelry, utensils, and furniture. The images in the family shrine and the temple were destroyed or thrown in water bodies. After that, the mob went to the villages of Azmatpur, Daspara, Nasianji, and Maheshpur. At 8:00 pm, the house of Gurucharan Dhar, in the village of Noagram, only six miles from Sylhet, was attacked. The next day at 7:00 am, a heavily armed Muslim mob surrounded the village. About 1,500 Hindus who inhabited the village fled to the nearby jungle. The mob looted the entire village, desecrated the tulsi manchas and the family shrines. Some houses were set on fire. In the nearby village of Mamrathpur, the houses of many Hindus, including those of Mahendra Chandra De, Kamakanta Dhar, and Ashwini Kumar De, were looted. The mob abducted one of the daughters of Ashwini Kumar De. The next day she was ravished, and the senseless body was returned home. In Dhakadakshin, the mobs abducted two unmarried daughters of Bharat Dutta on the night of 15 February. On the morning of 18 February, they returned home in a state of shock. When the family went to complain to the police, the police suggested an out-of-court settlement for a sum of 1,000 rupees. Numerous Hindu girls from the villages under the Sylhet Sadar police station were raped.

On 15 February, the house of Dinendra Chandra Deb Purakayastha in the village of Gangajal was looted and forcibly occupied by Muslim miscreants. At 9:00 am, the village of Silani under the Bahubal police station of the erstwhile Karimganj subdivision was attacked. The mob raised provocative slogans and set fire to Hindu houses. Many Hindus fled to the nearby jungles to save their lives while the others were forcibly converted to Islam. Those who refused to convert were killed. In Dhakadakshin and Kachuadi, girls were abducted from eminent Brahmin families. In the Chunarughat police station area of Habiganj subdivision, many Hindu families, including those of Ketan Das, Ashwini Nath, and Birendra Nath, were forcibly converted to Islam. In Fenchuganj, the factory of the steamer company was looted and set on fire. Pulin De, a Hindu, was murdered near Ilaspur. In Majigaon, under the Fenchuganj police station, the houses of Ambika Kabiraj and Makhan Sen were looted and set on fire. In the Balaganj police station area, in Rukanpur village, the houses of Digendra Sen, Gopesh Sen, and Shib Charan Das were looted, and the members were beaten up. In Madhurai and Kathalkhoi, Hindus were beaten up and forcibly converted to Islam. In the Golapganj police station area, the houses of Baikuntha Roy and Rashbehari Roy, in the village of Phulsain, were looted. In the Bishwanath police station area, all Hindu houses were looted in the village of Dandapanipur. A cow was slaughtered, and Hindus were forcibly converted to Islam. In Tukerkandi village, the Ghosh house was looted, Jogendra Ghosh was killed, and many Hindus were stabbed. In Sijerkachh, the Pal Chowdhury and Brahmin houses were looted, and everybody was forced to convert to Islam. Bimala Smrititirtha, a Hindu scholar, refused to convert. His sacred thread was torn and stamped upon, and he was stabbed repeatedly. The shikha of the Brahmins was torn by force. Idols were broken and thrown into nearby ponds.

On 16 February, a 300-strong Muslim mob attacked the village of Akhra. They destroyed the images and went after the priest, who fled. The mob then looted the entire village, including the houses of Haripada Chowdhury and Bimala Bhattacharya. On 17 February, the goondas went from house to house and attacked the Brahmins. Their sacred threads were torn and stamped upon, and they were forcibly converted to Islam. In the villages of Sunaita and Kurma, Hindu women were attacked. Their sindur and conch shell bangles were broken. In the village of Rajaganj Akhra, the houses of Nir Bhatta and Ram Chandra Bhatta were looted. On 17 February, a 500- to 600-strong armed mob attacked the village of Lakeshwar under the Chhatak police station. Brahmin houses were looted. Two of them were severely beaten up. The sacred threads of the Brahmins were torn, and their shikhas were cut off. They were forcibly converted to Islam. In Markul, the entire village was looted and forcibly converted to Islam. On 19 February, the village of Sadarpur, under the Zakiganj police station, was attacked. The house of Shuklal Namashudra was looted. When his brother went to lodge a complaint with the police, the police stabbed him, then wounded him with a bayonet and finally kicked him out of the police station. During the night, the villagers swam across the river to safety. At Pargram, the houses of Akrur Namashudra and Ramesh Namashudra were looted and forcibly occupied by Muslims.

=== Rajshahi District ===
On 28 February, the Kolkata-bound Assam Mail was attacked. On 28 February, disturbances erupted again in Rajshahi District. There were widespread incidents of murder, looting, and arson in the villages under the Tanore, Nachole, and Gomastapur police stations. Forcible occupation of Hindu houses and rape and molestation of Hindu women led to the exodus of Hindus to Maldah district in the Indian Union. In some cases, Bihari Muslims forcibly ejected Bengali Hindus from their houses and occupied them. During their journey to India, Hindus were subjected to all kinds of harassment. The Ansars seized almost every belonging that the refugees had in their possession. They made Hindu women suffer great indignities on the pretext of searches.

On 17 March, Pakistan police and the Ansars opened fire on Santal refugees who were crossing over to India near Balurghat. Seventeen were killed, and 14 were injured in the firing. The Pakistan armed forces and the Ansars drove away 20 Hindu families from Hariharpur village, very near to the border and adjacent to Balurghat in the Indian Union. They broke open the roofs of the houses and took away the corrugated iron sheets, along with large quantities of rice, paddy, mustard, jute, and utensils. In Jahanpur village, they forcibly took possession of the ornaments of Hindu refugee women. At the meeting between the District Magistrates and the Superintendents of Police of West Dinajpur district and Rajshahi district held at Farshipara, within Pakistan, the Pakistani authorities demonstrated their determination to pursue strong action against Bengali Hindus, Santals, and other tribals. Large numbers of Baloch soldiers were posted along the border near Balurghat.

=== Mymensingh District ===
In the Jamalpur and Kishoreganj subdivisions of Mymensingh District, rioting started on 11 February and continued till 15 February. The neighbouring Hindu villages around Sherpur, namely Lakshmanpur, Mucherer Char, Char Sherpur Jhankata, Bhatsana, and Sapmari, were attacked. Hindu houses were looted and burnt. Hindu houses in the villages of Atkapara, Firozpur, and Budda were burnt. In Jumpur village, three members of the family of Tarak Saha were killed and their residence burnt.

On 12 February, Hindu passengers on the Akhaura–Bhairab Bazar rail route between Comilla and Mymensingh were massacred. Taya Zinkin, the reporter of The Economist and The Manchester Guardian, reported that Mymensingh-bound trains from Ashuganj were stopped on the Bhairab Bridge on the Meghna. Muslim mobs attacked Hindu passengers from both sides of the bridge. Those who dived into the river and tried to swim ashore were hit by brickbats and forcibly drowned. According to eyewitness Pierre Dillani, about 2,000 Hindus were massacred on the Bhairab Bridge. On the same day, Hindu passengers on board were attacked near Sararchar, a railway station between Bhairab Bazar and Kishoreganj.

=== Jessore District ===
On 10 March, Muslim refugees who had arrived from West Bengal, led by Ansars, began to terrorize Hindus. In the Jhenaidah subdivision, Hindus were forcefully evicted from their houses, which were then occupied. The entire Hindu population of Teghari village emigrated to Kolkata. On their way, all their belongings were forcefully taken away by the Ansars and Muslim refugees from West Bengal. On 19 March, a batch of about 400 Hindu refugees from Jinjira village under the Maheshpur police station reached Hazarkhal village under the Hanskhali police station of Nadia district in West Bengal. While the group was crossing the Ichhamati, three armed Pakistani policemen fired at them, killing one person.

== Imprisonment of Hindu leaders ==
While the massacres were going on, the District Magistrate of Barisal asked Satindranath Sen, an anti-British revolutionary and Member of the Legislative Assembly of East Bengal from Barisal, to sign a declaration stating that peace and normalcy existed in the district. Sen refused to sign the document. On 15 February, Satindranath Sen was arrested under Section 307 CCP and BSPO 1946 and imprisoned as an ordinary prisoner. On 18 February, Sen wrote to Liaquat Ali Khan, the Prime Minister of Pakistan, apprising him of the situation in Barisal, to no avail. On 11 March, Suresh Chandra Biswas, a Member of the Legislative Assembly (MLA) of East Bengal from Sylhet, was arrested for addressing a public gathering where he protested against the arson of Hindu houses. Biswas was handcuffed, paraded through the streets, and locked up. A charge of arson was framed against him. He was imprisoned. On 16 March, the five Hindu members of the seven-member non-official inquiry committee investigating the Kalshira massacre were arrested. The committee had submitted a report, mostly corroborating the origin and extent of the violence as reported in the Indian press. On 23 March, 30 leading Hindus, including 72-year-old Mohini Mohan Kar, the zamindar of Kulaura, and prominent Congress leaders like Kripesh Chandra Bhattacharjee, were arrested from Maulvibazar in Sylhet District.

== Press censorship ==
In February, several attempts were made on Indian newspaper correspondents in the Feni subdivision of Noakhali. Dr. Dhirendra Kumar Dutta, the younger brother of PTI correspondent Jadugopal Dutta, was stabbed to death. On 2 March 1950, Jawaharlal Nehru, the Prime Minister of India, in a session in Parliament, acknowledged that all correspondents attached to Indian newspapers and the PTI working in East Pakistan were discredited and prevented from sending any news.

== Exodus of Bengali Hindus ==
Number of Hindu students in schools of Dhaka
School	Type	January 1950	December 1950
Priyanath High School	Boys	187	9
Pogose School	Boys	580	50
K. L. Jubilee School	Boys	719	52
Gandaria High School	Boys	245	10
East Bengal High School	Boys	204	16
Nabakumar Institution	Boys	51	5
Nari Shiksha Mandir	Girls	275	8
Banglabazar Girls High School	Girls	606	2
Anandamayee Girls High School	Girls	75	5
Gandaria Girls High School	Girls	227	10

There was a huge exodus of Hindus from East Bengal to different parts of India, including West Bengal, Assam, and Tripura. There was a major influx of Bengali Hindu refugees in West Bengal after the Kalshira massacre. Thousands of Hindu refugees were stranded at railway stations, steamer stations, and Dhaka airport. Dr. Bidhan Chandra Roy took responsibility for bringing the refugees to India. He arranged 16 chartered planes to airlift the stranded evacuees from Dhaka airport. He further arranged 15 big passenger steamers to rescue the stranded refugees from Faridpur and Barisal. In March 1950, an estimated 75,000 Bengali Hindu refugees from East Bengal were admitted to refugee camps in West Bengal. Around 200,000 refugees arrived in Tripura in March 1950. An estimated 110,000 refugees arrived in Karimganj district in Assam from Sylhet District up to 2 April 1950. On 11 April 1950, 2,500 Hindu refugees arrived at Shalimar in Howrah from Barisal in four chartered steamers. 20,000 refugees were still awaiting evacuation in Barisal. By 12 April 1950, 120,000 refugees had arrived in West Dinajpur district of West Bengal. Thus, more than 500,000 refugees had arrived in West Bengal since the exodus began in January 1950.

The total figure of refugees ran into millions. On 4 April 1950, Bidhan Chandra Roy stated that 2 million refugees from East Bengal had already taken shelter in India. According to Rabindranath Trivedi, a total of 3.5 million Hindu refugees arrived in India in 1950. According to author A. Roy, 500,000 Hindus were killed in the pogroms, which resulted in the exodus of 4.5 million Hindus into India. About a million Hindu refugees from Sindh arrived in India.

== Protests in India ==
The Government of West Bengal lodged a strong protest with the Pakistan government.

Jawaharlal Nehru, then Prime Minister of India, visited Kolkata on 6 March and later on 16 March. After seeing the plight of Bengali Hindu refugees, he appealed to Pakistani Prime Minister Liaquat Ali Khan to stop the atrocities.

== See also ==
- Noakhali riots
- 1964 East Pakistan riots
- Resignation letter of Jogendra Nath Mandal
