= Taia =

Taia may refer to:

- Taia (band), a Japanese metal band
- Taia (river), a tributary of the Jiul de Est River in Romania.
- Tiye or Taia, a queen of Ancient Egypt
- Princess Taia of Thebes, a character in Ibis the Invincible
- Taia (gastropod), a genus of freshwater snails in the family Viviparidae

== People ==
- Abdellah Taïa (born 1973), Moroccan writer
- Mapu Taia (born 1939), Cook Islands politician and Speaker of the Cook Islands Parliament
- Zeb Taia (born 1984), rugby league player

== See also ==
- Taya, a given name and surname
- Teia, the last Ostrogothic king in Italy
- Thaia (disambiguation)
- Tiye (name), Ancient Egyptian name
