= Zenaida =

Zenaida, Zenaide (Italian), Zénaïde (French), or Zinaida (Russian: Зинаида), from Greek: Ζηναΐς meaning "dedicated to Zeus".

It is a personal name used in many cultures for women. It can also refer to the genus Zenaida, a genus of doves named after Princess Zénaïde Bonaparte.

== As a personal name ==
=== Zenaida ===
- Zenaida (saint), traditional 1st century Christian saint
- Zenaida Alcalde (born 1981), Spanish circus performer
- Zenaida Beveraggi (born 1957), "Zeny" of pop music duet Zeny & Zory
- Zenaida Manfugás (1922–2012), Cuban-born American pianist
- Zenaida Moya, mayor of Belize City, Belize
- Zenaida Yanowsky (born 1975), Spanish ballet dancer

=== Zénaïde ===
- Zénaïde Laetitia Julie Bonaparte (1801–1854), wife and cousin of ornithologist Charles Lucien Bonaparte
- Zénaïde Rossi (1923–2005), stage name Irene Reni, Italian-French actress and singer

=== Zinaida ===
- Zinaida Aksentyeva (1900–1969), Ukrainian/Soviet astronomer
- Zinaida Amosova (born 1950), Soviet cross-country skier
- Zinaida Gippius (1869–1945), Russian poet
- Zinaida Greceanîi (born 1956), Moldovan politician
- Zinaida Kajevic (born 1979), Swedish politician
- Zinaida Korotova (born 1936), Russian rower
- Zinaida Kupriyanovich (born 2002), Belarusian singer
- Zinaida Liepiņa (1907–2000), Latvian sprinter
- Zinaida Portnova (1926–1944), seventh-grade Soviet partisan and Hero of the Soviet Union
- Zinaida Semenova (born 1962), Russian long-distance runner
- Zinaida Serebriakova (1884–1967), Russian painter
- Zinaida Turchyna (born 1946), Soviet handball player
- Zinaida Volkova (1901–1933), Russian Marxist, daughter of Leon Trotsky
- Zinaida Voronina (1947–2001), Soviet gymnast
- Zinaida Yusupova (1861–1939), Russian noblewoman at the end of the Romanov dynasty
