= Dumbo (2019 film) =

Live action fantasy film by Tim Burton

- Theatrical release poster
- Directed by: Tim Burton
- Screenplay by: Ehren Kruger
- Based on: Disney's Dumbo by Otto Englander Joe Grant Dick Huemer; Dumbo, the Flying Elephant by Helen Aberson Harold Pearl
- Produced by: Justin Springer; Ehren Kruger; Katterli Frauenfelder; Derek Frey
- Starring: Colin Farrell; Michael Keaton; Danny DeVito; Eva Green; Alan Arkin
- Cinematography: Ben Davis
- Edited by: Chris Lebenzon
- Music by: Danny Elfman
- Production companies: Walt Disney Pictures; Tim Burton Productions; Infinite Detective Productions; Secret Machine Entertainment
- Distributed by: Walt Disney Studios; Motion Pictures
- Release dates: March 11, 2019 (Los Angeles); March 29, 2019 (United States)
- Running time: 112 minutes
- Country: United States
- Language: English
- Budget: $170 million
- Box office: $353.3 million

Dumbo is a 2019 American fantasy period adventure film directed by Tim Burton from a screenplay by Ehren Kruger. It is a live-action adaptation of Walt Disney's 1941 animated film, and stars Colin Farrell, Michael Keaton, Danny DeVito, Eva Green, and Alan Arkin.

Plans for a film adaptation of Dumbo were announced in 2014, and Burton was confirmed as director in March 2015. Most of the cast signed on for the feature in March 2017 and principal photography lasted from July to November 2017 in England. It was the first of five live-action adaptations of prior animated Disney films released in 2019, along with Aladdin, The Lion King, Maleficent: Mistress of Evil, and Lady and the Tramp.

Dumbo premiered in Los Angeles on March 11, 2019, and was theatrically released in the United States on March 29. The film grossed $353.3 million worldwide against a $170 million budget and received mixed reviews from critics, who praised the performances of DeVito and Keaton but criticized the script.

== Plot ==
In 1919 Sarasota, Florida, equestrian performer Holt Farrier returns after World War I to his previous employer, the Medici Brothers' Circus. The circus has run into financial troubles; Ringmaster Medici reveals he was forced to sell his horses after Holt's wife, Annie, died from the Spanish flu outbreak. After Holt reveals that he lost his arm in the Battle of the Argonne, Medici instead hires him as the caretaker for Mother Ella Jumbo, the circus's pregnant Indian elephant. She gives birth to a calf with unusually large ears, and Medici orders Holt to hide them, fearing how the public might react to such a deformity.

However, the calf accidentally reveals his ears in his debut performance in Joplin, Missouri, and the crowd laughs and mockingly calls the calf "Dumbo" while pelting him with objects. Mrs. Jumbo, angered by her son's abuse, rampages into the ring, causing extensive damage, collapsing the big top, and accidentally killing Rufus, a sadistic handler. Anticipating public outrage over the incident, Medici sells Mrs. Jumbo. Holt's son and daughter, Joe and Milly Farrier, comfort Dumbo and discover that he can fly by flapping his ears and that feathers benefit his willingness to fly.

Dumbo is then forced to play the role of a firefighter clown tasked to put out a fire with water sprayed from his trunk, but the performance goes awry, and Dumbo is trapped on a high platform surrounded by flames. Milly delivers a feather to Dumbo, giving him the confidence to fly to safety. The audience is astounded, and word of his talent begins to spread. V. A. Vandevere, the wealthy owner of the Bohemian amusement park Dreamland, approaches Medici and proposes a collaboration: If Medici becomes Vandevere's business partner, the Medici Brothers' Circus troupe will permanently be employed to perform at Dreamland.

Dumbo's debut performance at Dreamland with Vandevere's star performer, French trapeze artist Colette Marchant, quickly goes wrong when he nearly falls off a high platform and starts trumpeting in panic after realizing that there is no safety net available to prevent possible injuries and fatalities. Hearing his mother's response to his call and realizing that she was placed in an exhibit at Dreamland called Nightmare Island after being sold, he flies out of the circus ring and reunites with her, greatly disappointing the audience. Annoyed by Dumbo's disobedience and fearing the possibility of his mother becoming a distraction to him, Vandevere fires the Medici troupe and orders Mrs. Jumbo's exhibit to be shuttered to secure his sterling reputation.

When Holt and the Medici troupe learn that Vandevere intends to have Dumbo's mother killed and that it is no longer safe for the two elephants to live with them, they make plans to free both of them. The circus performers utilize their various talents to break Mrs. Jumbo out of her enclosure, while Holt and Colette guide Dumbo to fly out of the circus. Vandevere attempts to stop them but starts a fire by mishandling Dreamland's electrical system, which spreads and destroys the park. After Dumbo saves Holt and his family from the fire, they are joined by Colette and the rest of the troupe to bring Dumbo and his mother to the harbor, where they board a ship back to their native home in India.

Sometime later, the renamed Medici Family Circus is reestablished and flourishes with Colette as the newest troupe member, Milly as host of a science lecture exhibition, and performers dressed as animals, in line with the circus's new policy of not using wild animals in captivity for entertainment. It is implied that Vandevere was convicted of burning down his own park for the insurance money. Meanwhile, Dumbo and his mother reunite with a herd of wild elephants, who applaud Dumbo as he flies with joy.

== Cast ==
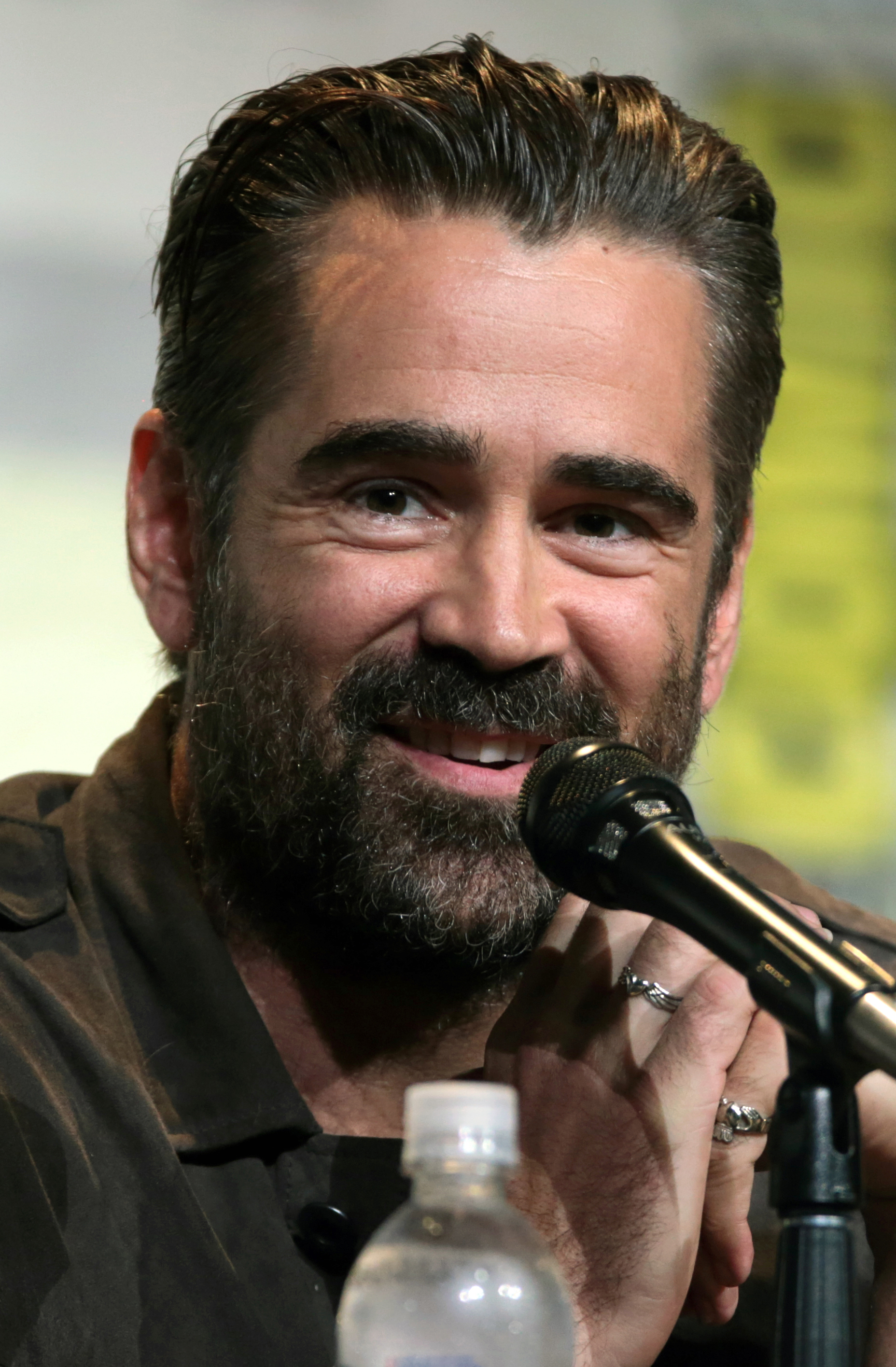
Colin Farrell stars as the film's protagonist for director Tim Burton. The additional main cast of Keaton, DeVito, Green, and Arkin all previously worked with the director.

- Colin Farrell as Holt Farrier, an amputated World War I veteran and former circus equestrian performer from Kentucky who is reassigned by Max Medici as handler of the circus's elephants.
- Michael Keaton as V. A. Vandevere, a greedy and ruthless enigmatic entrepreneur and amusement park owner who buys Medici's circus to exploit Dumbo for his bohemian amusement park, Dreamland.
- Danny DeVito as Maximilian "Max" Medici, a boisterous but goodhearted ringmaster and owner of the Medici Brothers' Circus who is loosely based on the ringmaster from the original film.
  - Devito's daughter Lucy cameos in the film as a Coat Check Girl.
- Eva Green as Colette Marchant, a virtuous French trapeze artist and Vandevere's faux girlfriend who performs at Dreamland.
- Alan Arkin as J. Griffin Remington, an investor.
- Nico Parker as Milly Farrier, Holt's feisty and benevolent daughter who, unlike her parents and brother, wants to make scientific discoveries.
- Finley Hobbins as Joe Farrier, Holt's son who wants to help out with the circus. He shares a special bond with his sister.
- Roshan Seth as Pramesh Singh, a snake charmer.
- DeObia Oparei as Rongo, a strongman who also works as the circus accountant.
- Joseph Gatt as Neils Skellig, a South African hunter and Vandevere's right-hand man.
- Douglas Reith as Sotheby, Vandevere's former butler.
- Sharon Rooney as Miss Atlantis, a mermaid performer.
- Michael Buffer as Baritone Bates, a Dreamland ringmaster.
- Zenaida Alcalde as Catherine the Greater, an illusionist and Ivan's wife.
- Miguel Muñoz Segura as Ivan the Wonderful, an illusionist and Catherine's husband.
- Frank Bourke as Puck, an organ grinder.
- Ragevan Vasan as Pritam Singh, a snake handler and Pramesh's nephew.
- Phil Zimmerman as Rufus, a sadistic animal trainer.
- Edd Osmond as the movement artist for Dumbo, a baby elephant with extremely large ears who is capable of flying.

== Production ==
=== Development and writing ===
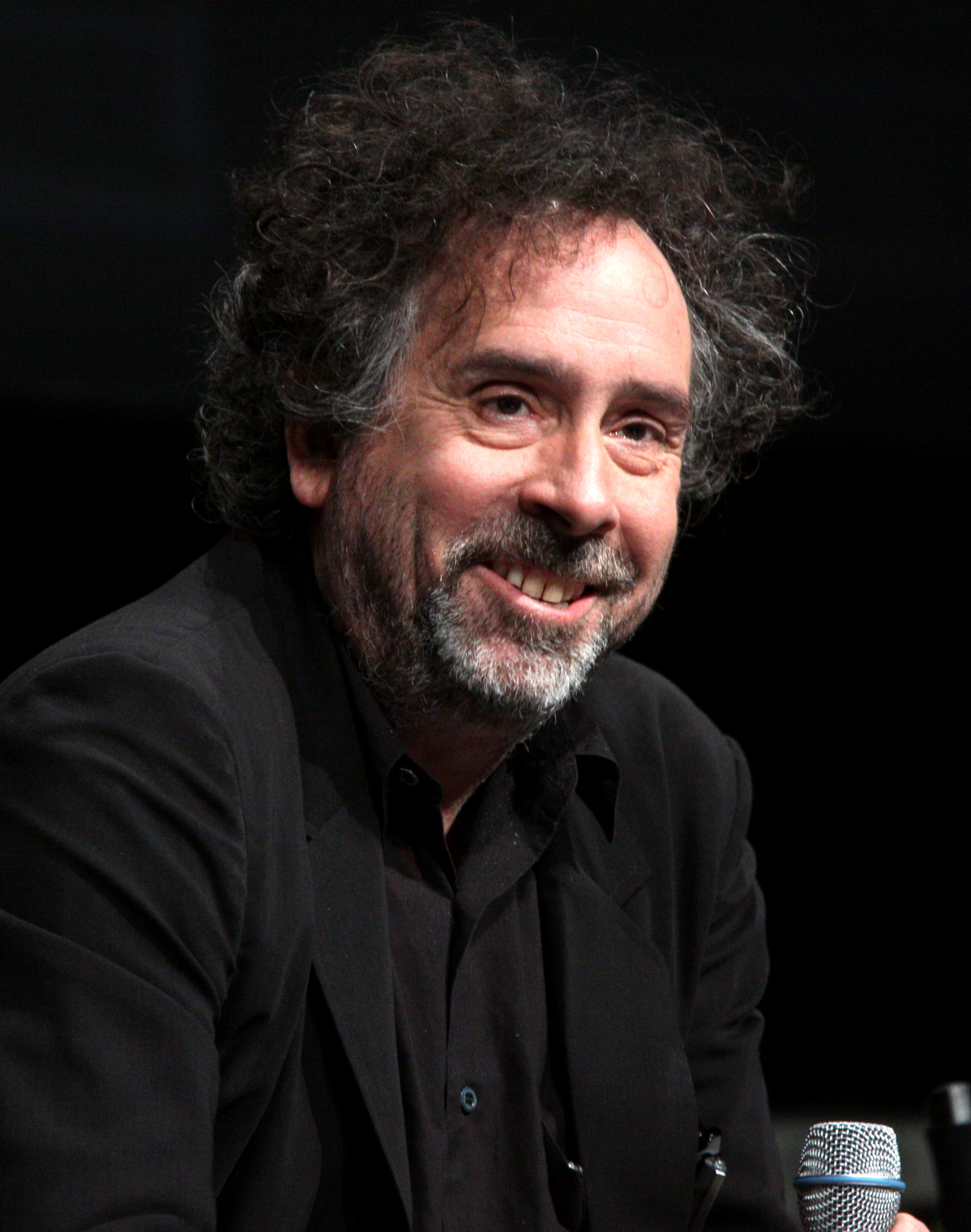
Tim Burton was selected as director in March 2015.

Early development for a live-action adaptation of Dumbo began in 2014, when Ehren Kruger gave producer Derek Frey a script for the film, which Frey gave the green light to. On July 8, 2014, it was announced that the film was in development for Walt Disney Pictures. Kruger was confirmed as the screenwriter, and Justin Springer as a producer along with Kruger. On March 10, 2015, Tim Burton was announced as the director. On July 15, 2017, Disney announced Dumbo would be released on March 29, 2019. The film features a different storyline from the original film's, though as star Colin Farrell described, "[t]he one central thing that holds true in both the original animation, the original cartoon" and the 2019 film, is the message of "believing in yourself and finding something inside you that allows you to become the best version of what you thought you could even be, and that we're all, regardless of the things that sometimes society says, should arrive us at being outcasts; they're the things that make us all individual, special, and beautiful regardless of how crippling a certain thing may be or how polarizing a certain physical attribute even may be."

The film does not feature talking animals, focusing instead on the human characters. Kruger wrote the script so that it "offered a way to tell that story in a framework that expanded it, but without redoing the original [film]", and a story that "was simple, with an emotional simplicity, and didn't interfere with what the basic through line of the original is about." As in the original film, Dumbo depicts the protagonist as a symbolic figure who does not fit in and uses their disabilities as an advantage. Kruger wrote the script in order to "explore how the people of the circus world would relate to Dumbo's journey", while Springer said that "[the production team] really wanted to explore the human side of [Dumbo's] story and give it historical context. In the animated feature, Dumbo flies for the world at the end of the film. [They] wanted to find out how the world reacts when people learn that this elephant can fly". The group of crows from the 1941 film that had been criticized as being racist were excluded from the film, and their dialogue was instead said by a ringleader character.

=== Casting ===
In January 2017, it was announced that Will Smith was in talks to play the father of the children who develop a friendship with the elephant after seeing him at the circus. However, Smith later passed on the role due to scheduling conflicts with Bad Boys for Life, among other reasons. He went on to be cast as the Genie in Disney's 2019 live-action film adaptation of Aladdin. Bill Hader, Chris Pine and Casey Affleck were also offered the role, but passed on it before Colin Farrell was cast. Farrell, a fan of Burton, chose to work on the film because "[t]he idea of [acting in] something as sweet and fantastical and otherworldly, while being grounded in some recognizable world that we can relate to, under the direction of [Burton], was a dream ... I've always been looking for something of that ilk." Jenna Ortega auditioned for one of the film's roles when she was just fourteen years old, feeling extremely "gutted" at not securing the part due to her doubts on if she would ever have the chance to work with Burton again; Ortega ultimately went on to collaborate with Burton in the Netflix series Wednesday and the 2024 film Beetlejuice Beetlejuice.

In March 2017, Burton's frequent collaborators, Eva Green and Danny DeVito, joined the cast as Colette, a trapeze artist, and Max Medici, the circus' ringmaster, respectively. Due to her fear of heights, Green trained with aerialist Katherine Arnold and choreographer Fran Jaynes in order to prepare for the role. In April 2017, another veteran of Burton's films, Michael Keaton, joined Dumbo, to complete the casting of prominent "adult" roles. Tom Hanks was reportedly in discussions for the role before Keaton's casting. Hanks would instead sign on for the role of Geppetto in Disney's 2022 live-action film adaptation of Pinocchio. In the summer of 2017, DeObia Oparei, Joseph Gatt, and Alan Arkin joined the cast. DeVito praised Burton and said that "[he loves] Tim and [he] would do anything to be in a movie with him."

=== Filming ===
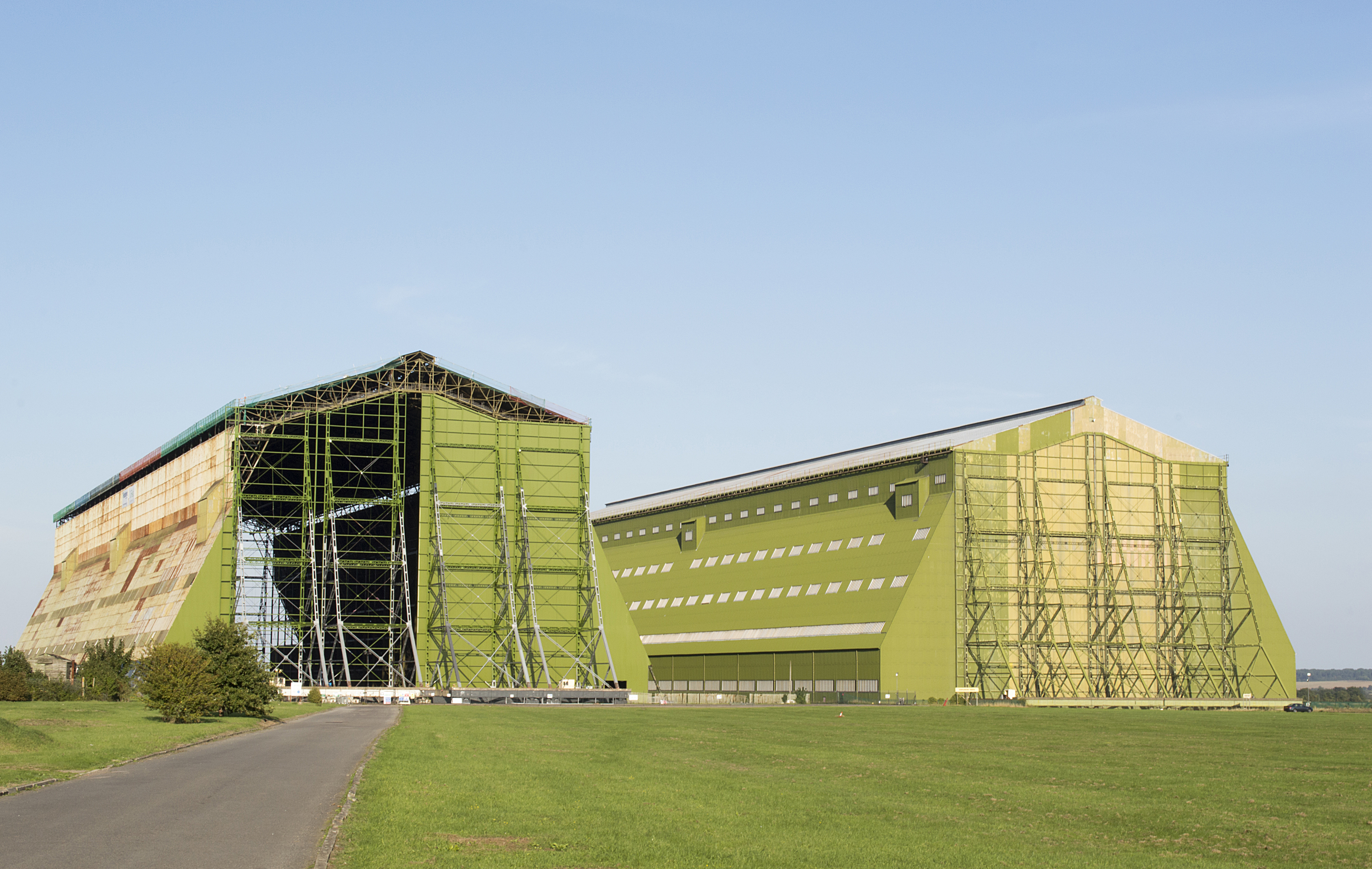
Cardington Airfield served as a filming location for the production.

Principal photography had begun by July 2017 in England, with most of the filming taking place at Pinewood Studios and Cardington Airfield. Two elephant props were used during filming "to give [the production team] an idea of his size and his shape in the scene; an idea of the lighting, and that kind of thing; where he's going to be for camera." Creature performer Edd Osmond used a green suit to represent the character while filming certain scenes, as well as an "interactive reference" for scenes that required the actors to be in contact with the character, and as a guide for Burton to use; with Burton later providing information of his performance to the animation team. Unlike most remakes of Disney animations, Dumbo mostly used practical sets during filming.

Production designer Rick Heinrichs designed the film's scenes in a way that represents both the film's story and the period setting. He stated that the film's story "provided a very specific period, but at the same time, having worked with Tim many times in the past, [he knows] that [Burton is] a little less interested in giving a history lesson as he is in the emotional story being told." The "Dreamland" and circus scenes were designed differently in order to contrast them. The production design crew were heavily influenced by the works of Edward Hopper, with Heinrichs stating that the team tried to create something similar to "[Hopper]'s reductive process of looking at environments and reducing it to its essence."

Heinrichs also said that the production design team had "to push the reality—the live action—a bit into the storybook world. [They] certainly make the baby elephant look believable, but [they] also stylized our world, pushing it into an expressive direction with all of the lighting, costumes, props and environments." Burton filmed the remake in sound stages, stating that "[f]or this kind of movie, shooting all indoors obviously helps with weather concerns and all those things. It's one movie where [they are] not sitting around, talking about the weather all day long." The production team also created a full-scale version of the train "Casey Jr." from the original film, though it was visually redesigned in order to reflect the circus' state. According to visual effects supervisor Richard Stammers, a motion base, which he described as "essentially a hydraulic round gimbal rig," was used for scenes in which Green's character flies with Dumbo, with hydraulic pistons used to simulate Dumbo's flying.

=== Visual effects ===
The visual effects were provided by Moving Picture Company, Framestore and Rise FX, with the help of Rising Sun Pictures and Rodeo FX. At Rodeo, to achieve the effects for the opening sequence of the train travelling through the country, augmented aerial footage was merged with matte paintings and computer-generated imagery. They would also do the effects of Holt's amputated arm by digitally recreating the character's costumes and the backgrounds obstructed by the sleeve. The Third Floor, Inc., tasked primarily with creating the animals of the film, achieved the effects of humans flying on Dumbo using a 3D mold of the character and an animatronic mounted on a 6-axis gimbal.

== Music ==
On October 4, 2017, Danny Elfman was announced as the composer for the film's score. He said that "[he and the production team] knew [they] would have to find a musical identity for Dumbo that was purely Dumbo." Elfman developed "a very simple [main] theme" as Burton "feels it's a simple story." Elfman also wrote background music for the film's scenes in the circus, and themes based on the characters' experiences. He also wrote a theme for Medici and Vandevere which he described as "a bit of a wicked thing." The score pays homage to Frank Churchill and Oliver Wallace's score from the original film.

Arcade Fire's version of "Baby Mine" was released as a single on March 11, 2019. The soundtrack was digitally released on March 29, 2019 and physically released on April 26, 2019.

== Release ==
=== Theatrical ===
Dumbo was released in the United States by Walt Disney Studios Motion Pictures on March 29, 2019. It held its world premiere at the Ray Dolby Ballroom in Los Angeles on March 11, 2019. The European premiere was held at the Curzon Mayfair Cinema in London on March 21, 2019. In a collaboration with Accenture Interactive, Disney set up a photo booth, using photography facial recognition, would give attendees at the 2019 South by Southwest festival an experience that would be based on the emotion expressed by the attendee. Disney spent around $120–140 million to market the film worldwide. A tie-in novelization of the film written by Kari Sutherland was published by Disney Publishing Worldwide on February 12, 2019.

=== Home media ===
Dumbo was released on DVD, Blu-ray, and Ultra HD Blu-ray on June 25, 2019. The film was amongst several of Disney's then recent releases available to watch exclusively on their streaming service, Disney+, which was launched in November 2019.

Dumbo was the No. 1 film on the Official Film Chart following its disc release in the United Kingdom. In June 2019, it debuted at No. 1 on both the combined DVD and Blu-ray Disc sales charts, as well as the dedicated Blu-ray Disc sales chart. Blu-ray formats accounted for 75% of its total unit sales, with 9% of sales coming from the 4K Ultra HD Blu-ray edition. In the week ending July 6, 2019, the film held onto the No. 1 spot on both the combined DVD and Blu-ray Disc sales charts, as well as the dedicated Blu-ray Disc sales chart.

== Reception ==
=== Box office ===
Dumbo grossed $114.8 million in the United States and Canada, and $238.5 million in other territories, for a worldwide $353.3 million. It was estimated the film would have had to gross more than $500 million worldwide in order to break even, and with a combined production and advertisement budget of $300 million, Deadline Hollywood reported it ultimately lost money.

In the United States and Canada, the film was released alongside The Beach Bum and Unplanned, and was projected to gross $50–65 million from 4,259 theaters in its opening weekend. The film made $15.3 million on its first day, including $2.6 million from Thursday night previews. It went on to debut to $46 million, topping the box office. The start was considered disappointing, given the $170 million budget and the Disney brand, with the blame put on the original film being 78 years old and the middling critical response versus poor marketing. In its second weekend, the film dropped 60%, to $18.2 million, finishing third, behind newcomers Shazam! and Pet Sematary, and then made $9.2 million in its third weekend, finishing fifth.

In other territories, Dumbo was projected to earn $80–90 million from 53 countries in its opening weekend, for a global debut of $137–155 million. Similarly to its domestic market, the film underperformed, grossing $73.5 million for a worldwide $119.5 million. Its largest markets were China ($10.7 million), Mexico ($7.2 million) and Japan ($2.4 million). It earned $39.6 million in its second weekend overseas, for a running total of $137.5 million. As of June 2019, its largest markets are the United Kingdom ($32.5 million), China ($21.9 million), Mexico ($21.6 million), France ($16.9 million), and Italy ($12.5 million).

=== Critical response ===
On review aggregator website Rotten Tomatoes, the film received an approval rating of 46% based on 375 reviews and an average rating of 5.5/10. The website's critical consensus reads, "Dumbo is held partly aloft by Tim Burton's visual flair, but a crowded canvas and overstretched story leave this live-action remake more workmanlike than wondrous." On Metacritic, the film has an average score of 51 out of 100, based on 55 critics, indicating "mixed or average" reviews. Audiences polled by CinemaScore gave the film an average grade of "A−" on an A+ to F scale, and those at PostTrak gave it 3.5 out of 5 stars.

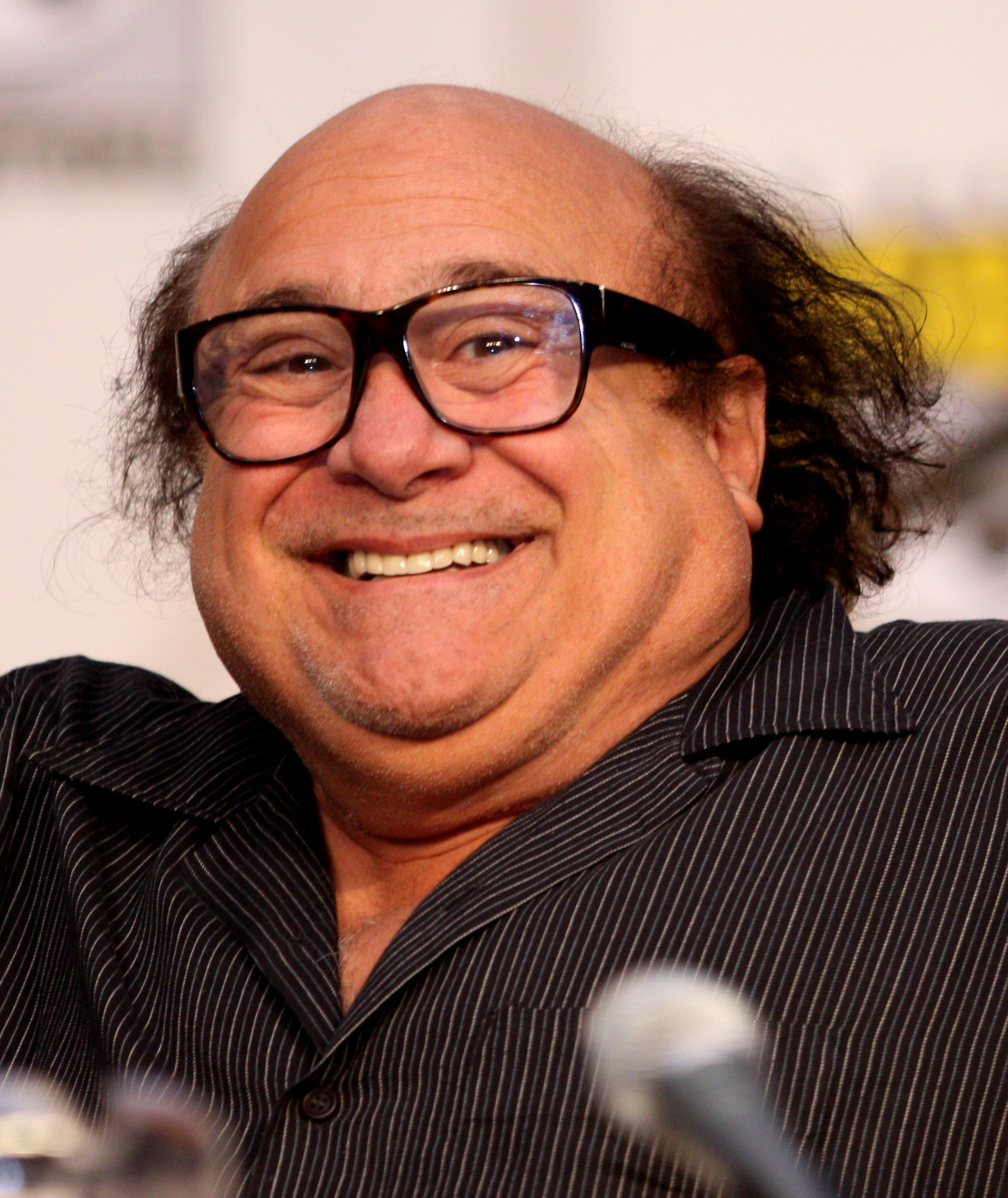
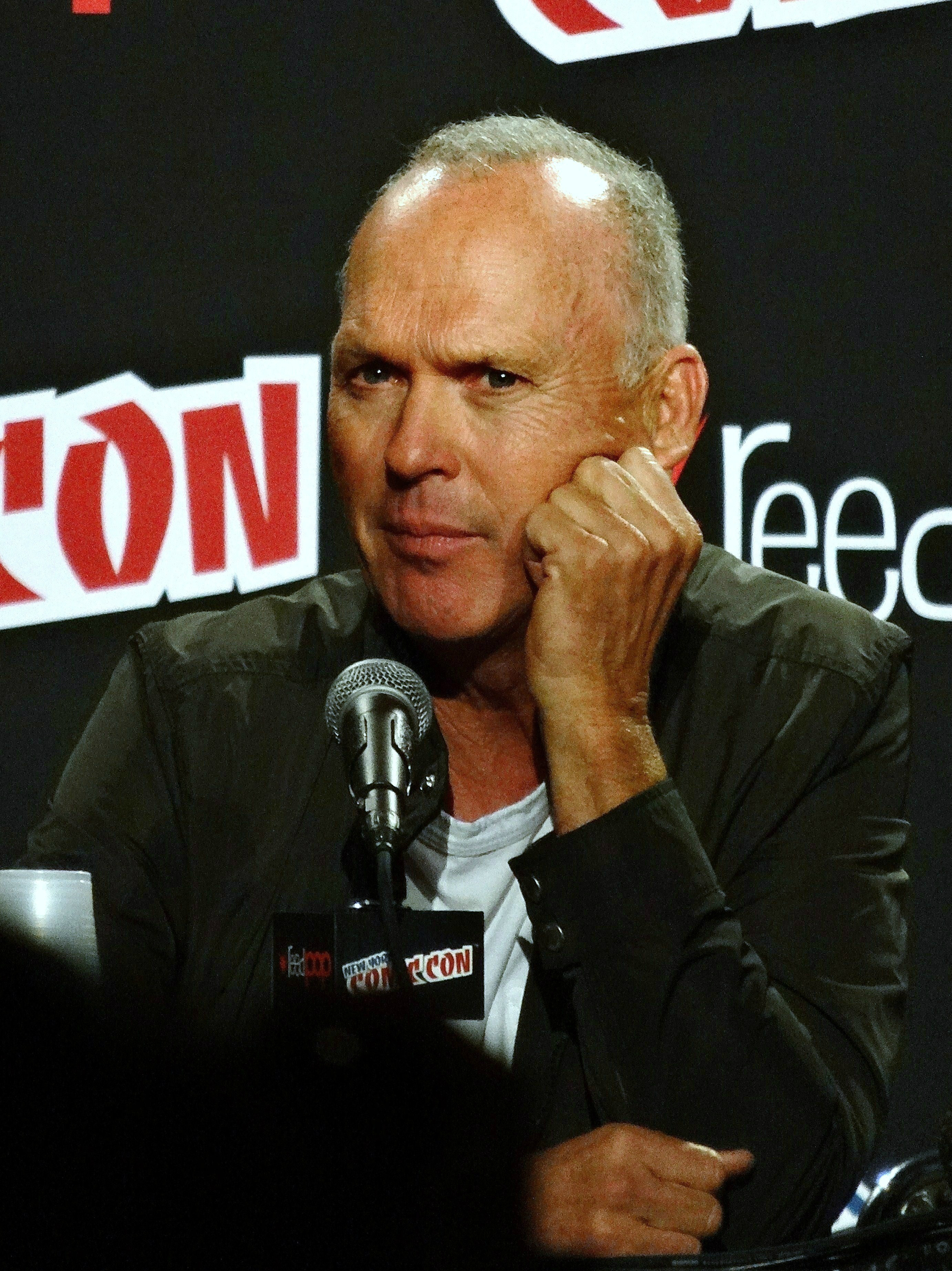
The performances of Danny DeVito and Michael Keaton received praise from critics.

Writing for The A.V. Club, Katie Rife gave the film a "B−" and wrote "characters are just there to keep the story moving, to provide awestruck reaction shots as we move from oddly muted spectacle to agreeable callback to the heartwarming happy ending. And yes, these are all symptoms of the same relentless conformist drumbeat the film is critiquing in its script. But what's more Disney than Disney controlling the ways in which a filmmaker can critique Disney?" David Rooney of The Hollywood Reporter wrote: "The hopes of diehard Burton fans might have been stoked by the recruitment of Michael Keaton and Danny DeVito, totems of the director's more consistent days. But this is another frustratingly uneven picture, with thin characters—human and animal—that fail to exert much of a hold, reclaiming the story only toward the end. Up to then, the filmmaker's overstuffed visual imagination and appetite for sinister gloom all but trample the enchantment of a tale that, at heart, is simple and whimsical. The central failure to recognize those virtues lies also in Ehren Kruger's cluttered screenplay." James Berardinelli from Reelviews called Dumbo "a perfectly adequate family film", rating it 3 out of 4 stars.

Conversely, Owen Gleiberman of Variety lamented disappointment in the film, stating that the film "transforms a gentle and miraculous tale into a routine story by weighing it down with a lot of nuts and bolts it didn’t need". For IndieWire, David Ehrlich gave split opinions on the acting, praising DeVito and Keaton's performances but criticizing Arkin's as "hilariously lazy" and stated it would invite the audience to "stop caring about the plot". The Guardian's Peter Bradshaw gave the film one star out of five, lamenting that "Tim Burton's new Dumbo lands in the multiplex big top with a dull thud. It is a flightless pachyderm of a film that saddles itself with 21st-century shame at the idea of circus animals, overcomplicating the first movie, losing the directness, abandoning the lethal pathos, mislaying the songs and finally getting marooned in some sort of steampunk Jurassic Park, jam-packed with retro-futurist boredom."

In 2022, Burton reflected negatively on the experience making the film stating: "The thing about Dumbo is that’s why I think my days with Disney are done, I realized that I was Dumbo, that I was working in this horrible big circus and I needed to escape. That movie is quite autobiographical at a certain level." In 2024, Keaton said: "I was clueless on Dumbo. I sucked in Dumbo."

=== Accolades ===
Ceremony	Category	Recipient(s)	Result	Ref.
AACTA Awards	Best Visual Effects or Animation	Richard Stammers, Hal Couzens, Hayley Williams, Dennis Jones, Corinne Teng	Nominated	
Alliance of Women Film Journalists Awards	Time Waster Remake or Sequel Award	Dumbo	Nominated	
Art Directors Guild Awards	Excellence in Production Design for a Fantasy Film	Rick Heinrichs	Nominated	
Golden Trailer Awards	Best Animation/Family	Walt Disney Pictures, Wild Card	Nominated	
Golden Trailer Awards	Best Animation/Family TV Spot	Walt Disney Pictures, Wild Card	Nominated	
Golden Trailer Awards	Best Animation/Family Poster	Dumbo	Nominated	
Golden Trailer Awards	Best Motion Poster	Dumbo	Nominated	
Saturn Awards	Best Fantasy Film	Dumbo	Nominated	
Saturn Awards	Best Production Design	Rick Heinrichs	Nominated	
Saturn Awards	Best Music	Danny Elfman	Nominated	
Visual Effects Society Awards	Outstanding Effects Simulations in a Photoreal Feature	Sam Hancock, Victor Glushchenko, Andrew Savchenko, Arthur Moody (for "Bubble Elephants")	Nominated	
