= Thaia =

Thaia may refer to:

- Thaia (leafhopper), a leafhopper genus in the tribe Erythroneurini
- Thaia (plant), a genus of flowering plants in the family Orchidaceae

== See also ==
- Taia (disambiguation)
