= Whiffen =

Whiffen is an English surname. Notable people with the surname include:

- Alma Joslyn Whiffen-Barksdale (1916–1981), American mycologist
- Blanche Whiffen (1845–1936), American actress
- David Whiffen (1922–2002), British physicist
- Kingsley Whiffen (1950–2006), Welsh footballer
- Marcus Whiffen (1916–2002), English architectural historian

== See also ==
- Wiffen, a surname
