= Pneumatic exercise equipment =

Exercise machine whose function is based on pneumatics

A pneumatic exercise machine or pneumatic exercise equipment is an exercise machine or equipment for physical exercise whose function is based on pneumatics, as opposed to or in combination with for example cables or hydraulics.

The difference to regular weights or exercise equipment is that the weight stacks, wires and other moving parts are replaced with a pneumatic cylinder whose resistance can be adjusted with air pressure. Modern machines with repetition counters and electrical pressure tubes promote precise training of certain muscle groups or a sector of physical functions affecting ones quality of life. Guidelines for health exercise can also be the purpose of training which can be pursued and monitored by loading a training program to a Smart Card and accomplish exercises guided by machines themselves.

== History ==
Using pneumatic cylinders in exercise machines is a rather new innovation.
First prototypes were born during the 80's and 90's.

== Claimed benefits and drawbacks ==
- Switch operated and stable control of resistance
- Lack of inertia
- Higher training effect
- Increased reliability
- Safety (no moving stacks or wires)

== See also ==
- Cable machine
- Free weight (equipment), for example dumbbells or barbells
- Hydraulic exercise equipment
