= Pradnya Daya Pawar =

Indian poet and writer (born 1966)

Pradnya Daya Pawar (born February 11, 1966), also known as Pradnya Lokhande, is an Indian poet and fiction writer of Marathi descent.

Pawar has been a member of the Maharashtra State Literary and Cultural Board. Recently she returned her state government awards in protest against what she believes is a rising atmosphere of intolerance and hate in India. A Buddhist, Pawar is the daughter of Daya Pawar.

Pawar is editor of fortnightly Pariwartanacha Watsaru (Marathi: परिवर्तनाचा वाटसरू).

== Writings ==
=== Poetry ===
- Antahstha (Marathi: अंतःस्थ) (1993, 2004)
- Utkat Jiwaghenya Dhagiwar (Marathi: उत्कट जीवघेण्या धगीवर)(2002)
- Mi Bhidawu Pahatey Samagrashi Dola (Marathi: मी भिडवू पहातेय समग्राशी डोळा) (2007)
- Aarpaar Layit Pranantik (Marathi: आरपार लयीत प्राणांतिक) (2009,2010)
- Drushyancha Dhobal Samudra (Marathi: दृश्यांचा ढोबळ समुद्र) (2013)
- Hillol Harwun Aatbahercha (Marathi: हिल्लोळ हरवून आतबाहेरचा) (2024)

=== Other writings ===
- Dhadant Khairalanji (Marathi: धादान्त खैरलांजी), a 2007 play
- Kendra Ani Parigh (Marathi: केन्द्र आणि परिघ), a 2004 collection of columns
- Mi Bhayankarachya Darwajyat Ubha Ahe – Namdeo Dhasal Yanchi Nivadak Kavita (Marathi: मी भयंकराच्या दरवाज्यात उभा आहे - नामदेव ढसाळ यांची निवडक कविता), a work co-edited with Satish Kalsekar, 2007
- Disha – Mahavidyalayin Kavi – Kavyitrinchya Kavita (Marathi: दिशा - महाविद्यालयीन कवी - कवयित्रींच्या कविता), a work co-edited with Nitin Rindhe, 2007
- Afawa Khari Tharawi Mhanun (Marathi: अफवा खरी ठरावी म्हणून), a 2010 collection of short stories
- Tehaltikori (Marathi: टेहलटिकोरी), a 2016 collection of columns
- Arwachin Aaran (Marathi: अर्वाचीन आरण), a 2020 collection of columns
- Go. Pu. Deshpande Yanchya Natakancha Chikitsak Abhyas (Marathi: गो. पु. देशपांडे यांच्या नाटकांचा चिकित्सक अभ्यास), a 2016 Unpublished Ph.D. thesis, Mumbai University

=== English Translations ===
- Let the Rumours be True, 2017 Translated by Maya Pandit, AuthorsUpFront

=== Kannada Translations ===
- Pradnya Daya Pawar Kathegalu, 2012 Translated by Chandrakant Pokale, Kanva Pratishthana

== Honors and awards ==
- Gangadhar Gadgil Sahitya Puraskar (2022)
- Matoshree Bhimabai Ambedkar Award (2003)
- Birsa Munda Rashtriya Sahitya Puraskar
- Maharashtra Foundation Award
- Shanta Shelke Award
- Maharashtra State's Keshavsut, Balkavi and Indira Sant Vishesh Puraskar
- Bodhivardhan Award
- Maharashtra State's Ga.La.Thokal Vishesh Puraskar
- Vanita Samaj Gaurav Puraskar
- Presided over in various prestigious Literary Gatherings such as Gunijan Sammelan (2012, Aurangabad), Regional Sahitya Sammelan (2015, Patan, District Satara), Asmitadarsh Sammelan (2017, Latur), and Shikshak Sahitya Sammelan (2019, Virar, District Palghar).
