= Daya Ratnasooriya =

Sri Lankan academic and researcher

Wanigasekera Daya Ratnasooriya
- වනිගසේකර දයා රත්නසූරිය
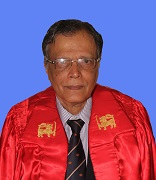
- Education: BSc. (Hons)(Cey), PhD (Strathclyde, UK) DSc. (Peradeniya, Sri Lanka), DSc (Honorary, University of Colombo), FTWAS, FNASSL, FBiol (Sri Lanka)
- Known for: Biologist, Academic, Researcher
- Title: Professor

Wanigasekera Daya Ratnasooriya (වනිගසේකර දයා රත්නසූරිය) BSc. (Hons)(Cey), PhD (Strathclyde, UK) DSc. (Peradeniya, Sri Lanka) DSc (Honorary, University of Colombo), FTWAS, FNASSL, FBiol (Sri Lanka), Charted Biologist, Institute of Biology, Sri Lanka, is a Sri Lankan academic and researcher. He was born in 1948. He is an emeritus professor of zoology, University of Colombo, Sri Lanka and a Senior Professor at the General Sir John Kotelawala Defence University, Sri Lanka.

== Education ==
Ratnasooriya commenced his school education at Royal primary school and then at Royal College. He subsequently entered the Faculty of Science at the University of Ceylon where he in 1972 he obtained a B.Sc (Hon) in Zoology. In 1978 he earned his PhD in Reproductive Physiology/ Pharmacology from the Department of Physiology and Pharmacology, University of Strathclyde, Glasgow, after securing an Open Commonwealth Scholarship. In 2008 he earned his DSc. in Life Sciences from University of Peradeniya.

== Research ==
Ratnasooriya has a multifaceted research interest (Bioactivity of Sri Lankan botanicals including Sri Lankan black tea, Biology of Sri Lankan elephants and bats) and has published over 360 publications in reputed peer reviewed journals and over 250 research communications presented at scientific conferences. His work has been cited widely. According to Google Scholar, cited 5,564 times with a h-index of 37 and i10 index of 129. (as at 18-01-2023)

== Honors ==
Ratnasooriya is in the Hall of Fame of the Sri Lanka Association for the Advancement of Science (SLAAS). He was felicitated by the Institute of Biology, Sri Lanka for the contributions made to the field of Biology. In recognition of outstanding contribution in researching and promoting the developing world, Ratnasooriya was selected as a Fellow of Third World Academy of Sciences, an achievement which is currently only held by five Sri Lankan scientists. On an Open Commonwealth Fellowship for a one-year stint Ratnasooriya has conducted research on reproduction with Dr. R.M. Sharp and Dr. Jhon Atkien at MRC Reproductive Biology Unit at Edinburgh, UK. He has served and serving in several editorial boards of scientific journals. University of Colombo granted the prestigious honorary DSc to Prof. Ratnasooriya in 2016 upon his retirement. In 2020, Daya Ratnasooriya has been ranked among the top 2% of scientists around the world in a recent paper from Stanford University, published in the journal PLoS Biology. This study has classified the scientists based on their career-long citation impact until the end of 2019. He was among the Stanford list of top 2% of scientist around the world from 2020-2024.

== Awards ==
Ratnasooriya has received Presidential Research Award on 14 occasions based on his research published in journals indexed under science citation index, 2 Lifetime Awards namely, CVCD award and GRC award from Sri Lanka Association for the advancement of Science. Ratnasooriya has also received the Research Award for best research Scientist in the Faculty of Science, University of Colombo, Sri Lanka for 12 consecutive years and University Grants Commission Research Achievement Award for Excellence in Research, 3 Merit Awards and 2 Commendation Awards from the Natural Research Energy and Science Authority of Sri Lanka.
