= Daya, Pemba =

Village in Zanzibar, Tanzania

Coordinates: 5.116667°S 39.716667°E

Daya is a village on the Zanzibari island of Pemba in Tanzania. It is located in the northwest of the island, four kilometres south of Wete.
