= Universal Gym Equipment =

American exercise equipment manufacturer

- Founded: 1957; 69 years ago
- Founder: Harold Zinkin
- Defunct: 2006
- Fate: Acquired by Nautilus, Inc.
- Parent: Flexible Flyer (1998-2006)

Universal Gym Equipment was an American manufacturer of exercise equipment, in particular weight machines. It was founded by Harold Zinkin in 1957. In 1998, it was acquired by Flexible Flyer. In 2006 it was acquired by Nautilus, Inc. The Universal Gym brand was subsequently discontinued except for a line of selectorized dumbbells.

== History ==
Harold Zinkin was an enthusiastic weightlifter and bodybuilder in the 1930s. He was a habitué of the famous Muscle Beach bodybuilding milieu in southern California, was the first "Mr. California" in 1941, and finished second in the 1945 Mr. America contest.

Barbells and dumbbells had been used for strength training for many years, especially by weightlifters and bodybuilders. However, inexperienced users could injure themselves with these "free weights".

In the late 1940s and early 1950s, Zinkin operated several gyms in the Los Angeles area. Zinkin wanted to make strength training safer and more accessible to novices, and thus broaden the appeal of the sport. To that end, he developed the "weight machine". Instead of lifting a bar with weight plates on it, the user pulls or pushes a handle connected by levers or cables to a stack of weight plates riding on steel guideposts. This allows a user to perform weightlifting exercises with no risk of dropping the weight on himself.

It also allows weight resistance to be in any direction (i.e. down as well as up, or rotary), and for the user's range of motion to be constrained, thereby concentrating effort in a specific muscle group.

Another key feature was the much easier change of weight. With barbells and dumbbells, lifting at different weights required either a set of bells with different fixed weights, or else adding and removing weight plates at both ends, a process which could take up to a minute. On Zinkin's machines, the weight lifted was selected by inserting a pin into the weight stack; moving the pin took only a few seconds.

Zinkin marketed his machines under the "Universal Gym" trademark. They proved highly successful. He sold several custom-built units, and in 1963 began mass production.

The standard "Universal Gym" incorporated stations for eight or ten different exercises in a single large frame. Often these units included non-weight exercise stations, such as a chin-up bar or a slant board for sit-ups.

Athletic and exercise venues of all sorts - schools, colleges, YMCAs, private gyms (such as the Vic Tanny chain), and professional sports teams - acquired Universal Gym machines to supplement or replace free weights.

Zinkin wrote later, "If I'm proud of anything, it's that machine and the fact that there probably isn't one professional athlete in the world who hasn't worked out on a Universal at least once."

Universal also offered single-exercise machines, and smaller units for home use. With its strong brand recognition, Universal also made and sold other fitness equipment, including free weights, weight lifting benches, and machines for cardiovascular exercise.

In 2004, the Universal product line included Power Circuit Single Stations, Free Weight Machines, Classic Chrome Single Stations, and Multi-Station Machines — all based on the design of Zinkin's original Universal Gym.

Universal had a number of industry "firsts", including such products as the "Dynamic Variable Resistance" technology that varied the resistance applied to muscle groups by an exercise machine throughout the entire range of motion.

However, from the 1980s onward, Universal faced increasing competition from Nautilus and other rivals. Zinkin retired from the company. In 1998, it was acquired by Flexible Flyer, a maker of outdoor recreational products such as sleds and swing sets. Flexible Flyer later decided that Universal did not fit its business. In 2006 Universal was acquired by Nautilus, Inc.In 2011, Nautilus released for a line of selectorized dumbbells under the Universal brand.
