= Daya Shankar (cricketer) =

Indian cricketer

Daya Shankar was an Indian cricketer who played for Gwalior.

Shankar made a single first-class appearance for the side, during the 1943–44 season, against Delhi. From the lower-middle order, he scored a single run in the first innings of the match, and 18 runs in the second. He took nine wickets with the ball during the match.
