= Exercise machine =

Device for physical exercise

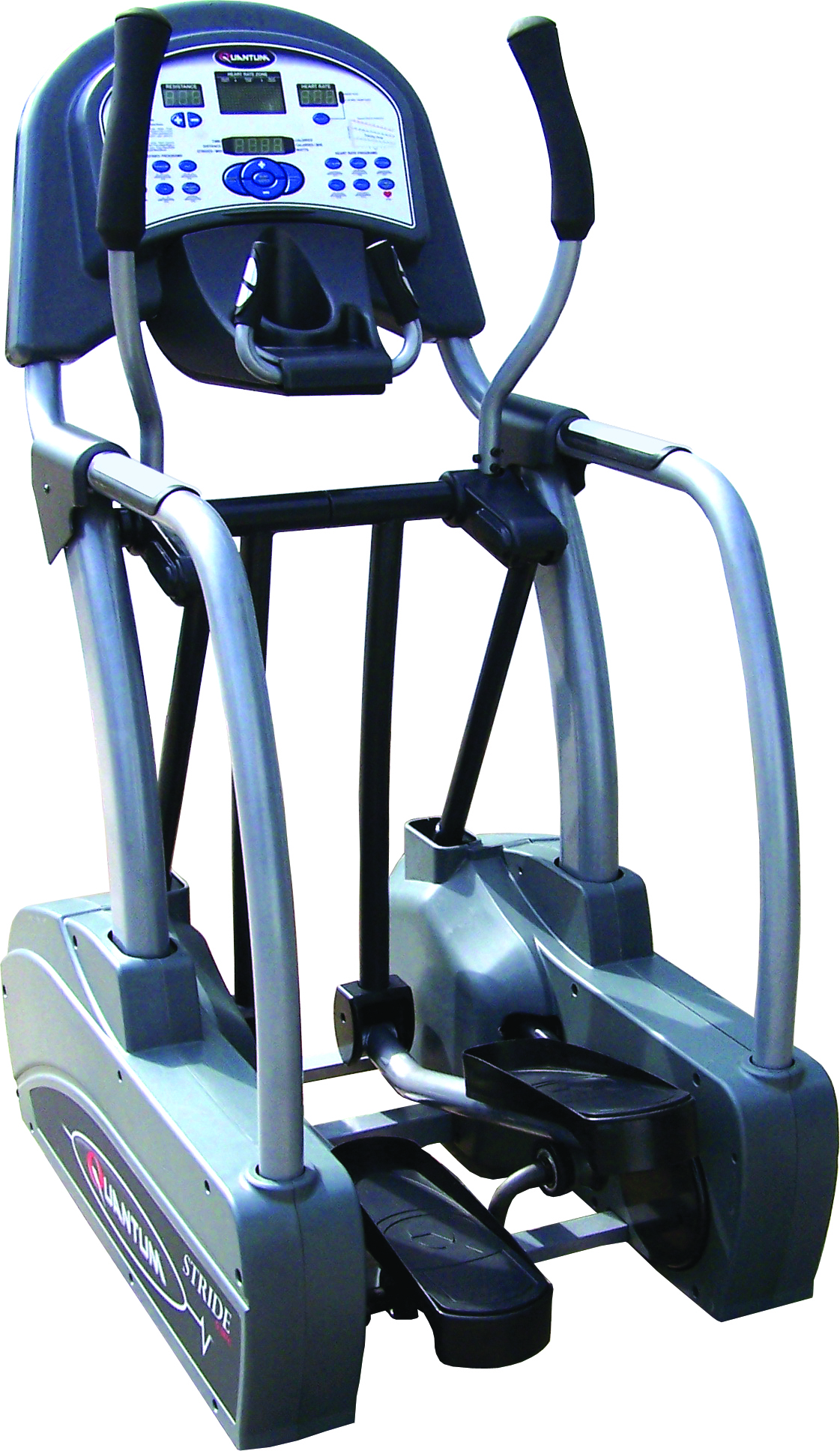
An elliptical machine, a type of exercise machine

An exercise machine is any machine used for physical exercise. These range from simple spring-like devices to computerized electromechanical devices to recirculating-stream swimming pools. Most exercise machines incorporate an ergometer. An ergometer is an apparatus for measuring the work a person exerts while exercising as used in training or cardiac stress tests or other medical tests.

== Resistance machines ==
=== Weight machines ===
Weight machines use gravity as the primary source of resistance, and a combination of simple machines to convey that resistance, to the person using the machine. Each of the simple machines (pulley, lever, wheel, incline) changes the mechanical advantage of the overall machine relative to the weight.

=== Other kinds of resistance machines ===
- Friction machines
- Spring-loaded machines (such as BowFlex)
- Resistance band
- Pneumatic exercise equipment
- Hydraulic exercise equipment
- Whole body vibration
- Fan-loaded machines
- Bullworker
- Outdoor gym
- Treadmill

== Endless-path machines ==
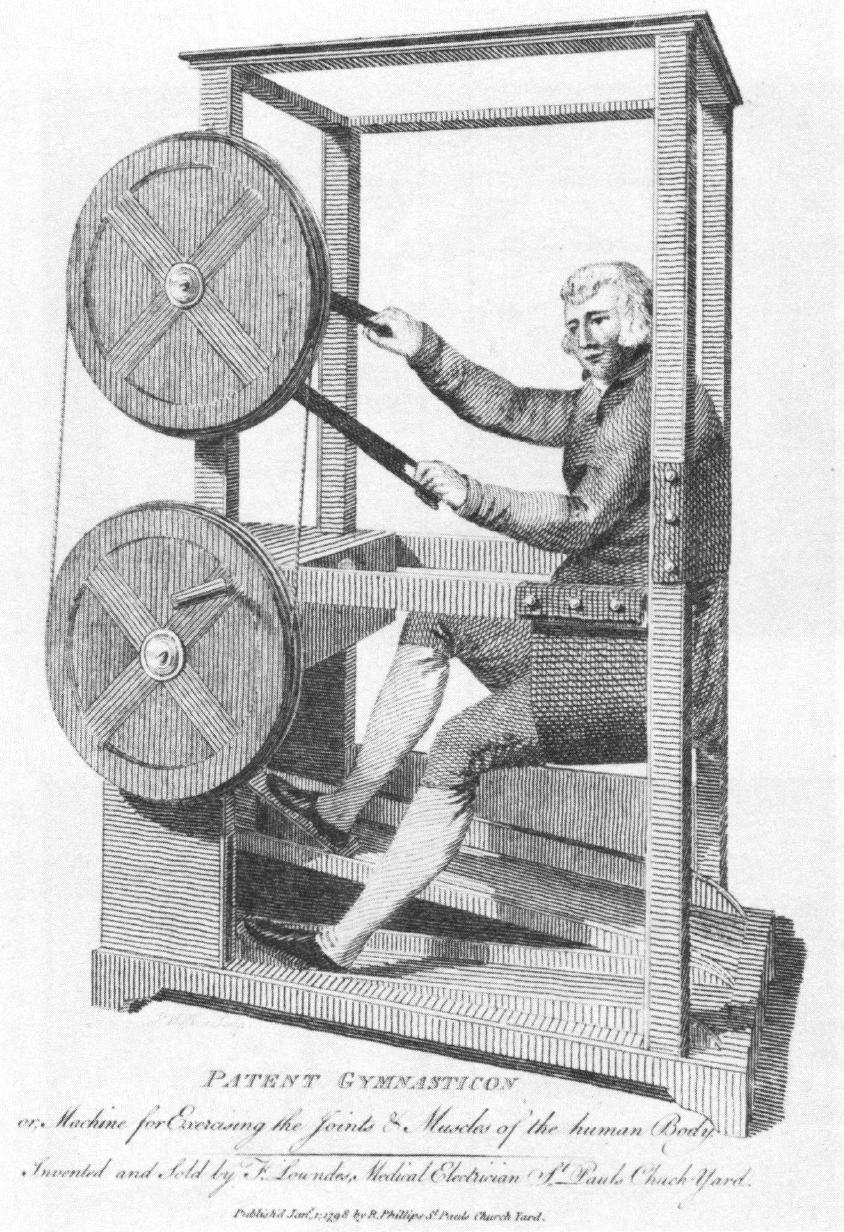
The Gymnasticon, an early exercise machine resembling a stationary bicycle

=== Stationary bicycles ===
- Exercise bicycle

=== Running/walking machines ===
- Elliptical trainer
- Treadmill

=== Elliptical machines ===
Ellipticals (elliptical machines) are a combination of stair-climbing and a treadmill. Generally it contains two tracks upon which the user stands. Users describe an elliptical motion (hence the machine name) while walking or jogging. Some ellipticals have magnetic resistance controls that add difficulty to doing the motion.

=== Glider machines ===
This machine allows the user to stand on two separate foot pedals and use their own muscles to create the movement. The stabilized movement can be likened to that of a "swing set" for each leg.

=== Climbing machines ===
Also named stair-climbing machines, they work the user's legs as they pump pedals up and down, much like climbing stairs. Some climbing machines have handles to push and pull to exercise the whole body.

=== Rowing machines ===
Rowing machines, also named rowers, simulate the body movements of using a rowing boat.

== See also ==
- Chin-up bar
- Exercise equipment
- Rehabilitation
- Sports medicine
- Statics
