= Daya Master =

Sri Lankan separatist militant spokesman

- வேலாயுதம் தயானிதி
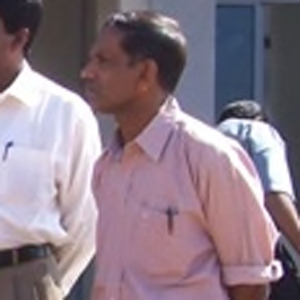
- Pronunciation: Vēlāyutam Tayāniti
- Born: Velayutham Dayanidhi; 3 March 1954 (age 71); Point Pedro, Ceylon
- Other names: தயா மாஸ்டர் ( "Daya Master" )
- Citizenship: Sri Lanka
- Occupation: Media
- Years active: 20 April 2009
- Organization: Liberation Tigers of Tamil Eelam
- Known for: Involvement with LTTE

Velayutham Dayanidhi (Tamil: வேலாயுதம் தயாநிதி Vēlāyutam Tayāniti; born 3 March 1954; commonly known as Daya Master) was a leading member and media spokesman for the Liberation Tigers of Tamil Eelam (LTTE), a separatist Tamil militant organisation in Sri Lanka.

== Early life and family ==
Dayanidhi was born on 3 March 1954 in Kilinochchi in northern Ceylon. He hails from Thambasiddy near Point Pedro. He worked as private tutor of English language and acquired the name Daya Master.

Daya Master married his wife, a teacher, in 1996. They have a daughter.

== Militant ==
It's alleged that when the Indian Peace Keeping Force occupied northern Sri Lanka in the late 1980s, the Eelam People's Revolutionary Liberation Front (EPRLF), an Indian-backed Tamil militant group, arrested and tortured Daya Master for supporting the LTTE. It's alleged that Daya Master only survived death due to the pity shown by EPRLF commander Sugi.

Daya Master grew closer to LTTE in the early 1990s and during the 1994 peace process he, on behalf of the LTTE, met with dignitaries from the South who were visiting Jaffna Peninsula. Later, with the help of Colonel Soosai, he became the LTTE's media spokesman. He came to prominence as the LTTE's public relations man during the 2002–2006 cease fire.

After suffering a heart attack Daya Master was admitted to the private Apollo Hospital in Colombo on 13 July 2006 to undergo an angiogram. He was transported from Kilinochchi to Colombo with military escort in the Mitsubishi Montero belonging to UPFA provincial minister Ananda Sarath Kumara Rathnayake. The Sinhalese nationalist National Movement Against Terrorism staged a protest outside the hospital on 14 July 2006, demanding Daya Master's arrest. Daya Master was discharged on 15 July 2006. He returned to Kilinochchi, escorted by the Sri Lankan military and the Sri Lanka Monitoring Mission (SLMM). It was reported that the SLMM had paid the hospital bill. The SLMM denied the reports. It was alleged that the Sri Lankan Government had allowed Daya Master to travel to Colombo in return for the LTTE releasing Sub Inspector Bandujeewa Bopitigoda. Bopitigoda was released on 26 August 2006.

Daya Master and his colleague George Master surrendered to the Sri Lankan military at Puthumatalan on 20 April 2009, just days before the civil war ended with the defeat of the LTTE. The two men were arrested and taken to Colombo. They were taken to the 4th floor of the Criminal Investigation Department headquarters in Colombo to be interrogated. The CID's 4th floor is notorious for alleged torture, rape and other human rights abuses. After being "rehabilitated" the two men were sent to jail.

Days after defecting, Daya Master claimed that the LTTE had shot dead two hundred civilians trying to flee the fighting. After the end of the war in May 2009 Daya Master and Karuna Amman were flown to Puthumatalan by the Sri Lankan military to identify the body of LTTE leader V. Prabhakaran.

Daya Master and George Master were detained under the Prevention of Terrorism Act (PTA) but were not charged. They were released on bail by Colombo Chief Magistrate Nishantha Hapuarachchi in September 2009 after the CID claimed that there wasn't any evidence to prosecute the two men under the PTA. One of the bail conditions was that they both had to report to CID headquarters in Colombo once a month but this condition was relaxed in February 2010 after which they only had to report to the CID office in Jaffna.

== Later life ==
Daya Master then started working on the news desk for Dish Asia Network (DAN TV), a somewhat pro-government broadcaster based in northern Sri Lanka owned and operated by one-time Minister of the Mahinda Rajapaksa Cabinet- Douglas Devananda.

In April 2013 Daya Master announced that he would contest the upcoming elections to Northern Provincial Council as a candidate for the governing United People's Freedom Alliance (UPFA). It was reported that the UPFA was considering Daya Master to be its chief ministerial candidate.
