= Daya (virtue) =

Sanskrit word

Daya (Sanskrit: दया, IAST: dǎyā) is a Sanskrit word commonly translated as "sympathy" or "compassion". It is derived from the root word 'da', meaning "gift" and refers to a concept in Hinduism and Sikhism in which one feels sympathy for the suffering of others. In the Yoga and Hindu tradition, daya is considered one of the 10 Yamas.

== Discussion ==
The Padma Purana defines daya as a virtuous desire to alleviate the sorrows and difficulties of others by striving. Matsya Purana describes daya as a value that makes all living beings like oneself, seeking the welfare and well-being of other living beings. Matsya Purana claims that daya is one of the necessary ways to be happy. Ekadashi Tattvam explains daya is treating a stranger, a relative, a friend, and a foe as one's own self; it argues that daya is that state when one sees all living beings as part of one's own self, and when everyone's suffering is seen as one's own suffering. In the Mahabharata, Indra praised Yudhisthira for his daya and sympathy for all living beings. Tulsidas contradicts Ahamkara with daya, claiming that daya is the source of religious life, where Ahamkara is the source of sin.

In Hinduism, daya is not kripa, or feeling sorry for the sufferer, because that is marred with condescension; daya is recognizing one's own and another's suffering in order to actively alleviate that suffering. Daya is the basis for Ahimsa, a core virtue in Hindu philosophy and an article of everyday faith and practice.

There are two forms of daya - one for those who suffer even though they have done nothing wrong, and one for those who suffer because they have done something wrong. Absolute daya applies to both, while relative compassion addresses the difference between the former and the latter. Examples of the latter include those who plead guilty or are convicted of a crime such as murder; In this case, the quality of daya should be balanced with the quality of judgment.
