= Zenaida Alcalde =

Spanish circus performer (born 1981)

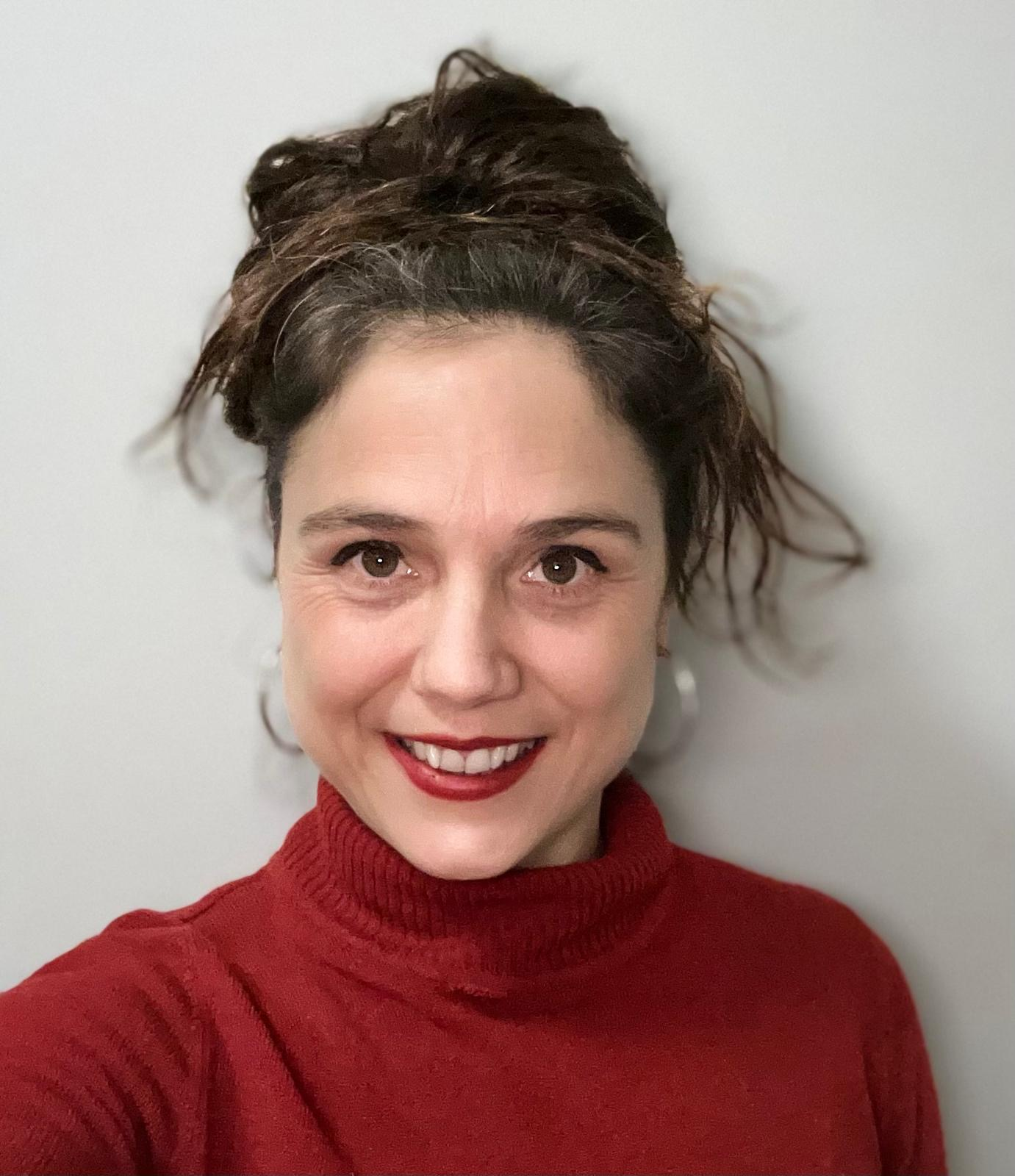
- Born: 1981 (age 43–44); Madrid, Spain
- Education: Carampa Circus School
- Occupations: Circus performer, trapeze artist, actress, teacher
- Website: Puntocero Company

Zenaida Alcalde (born 1981) is a Spanish circus performer, trapeze artist, actress, and teacher.

== Biography ==
Alcalde was born in Madrid in 1981. She began her artistic career studying theater. Later, she learned about circus arts and began training at the Carampa Circus School in Madrid. She moved to London, where she lived for eight years, and studied at The Circus Space.

In 2008, together with fellow circus performer and magician Miguel Muñoz Segura, Alcalde founded Puntocero Company, a group that performs shows mixing theater, circus, and magic. She also directed and acted in the shows Trece, Choices, and Fragmentada. Abroad, she has worked with DV8 Physical Theatre, Nofit State Circus, and the Tattoo Theater.

Since 2009, she has taught aerial techniques at the Carampa Circus School, and since 2014, in the Visual Arts and Dance program at King Juan Carlos University.

As part of the 2018–2019 Spanish-Colombian Foco Cultura agreement, promoted by Acción Cultural Española, Alcalde won a residency for circus professionals, with the objective of sharing her work methods and developing a process of collaboration and mutual training with the Transeúnte Theater Scenic Collective in Pasto, Colombia.

In 2019, Alcalde appeared in the Disney film Dumbo, playing Catherine the Greater, alongside Muñoz and actors such as Colin Farrell and Danny DeVito.

On the occasion of the 50th anniversary of the demolition of the old Circo Price in Plaza del Rey in 1970, Teatro Circo Price in Ronda de Atocha presented the show Mil Novecientos Setenta Sombreros from 14 October to 1 November 2020. This was a circus and theater production with dramaturgy by Aránzazu Riosalido and Pepe Viyuela, under the direction of Hernán Gené, and in which Alcalde performed the trapeze numbers.

Her shows have been performed on various stages, as well as at circus and theater festivals and fairs, such as the London International Mime Festival and the Edinburgh Festival Fringe. She has also been the aerial choreographer of productions such as Rebe al Rebés and Sin miedo.

In May 2023, Alcalde was one of the four circus directors invited to participate, with the short piece Extraña devoción, in the project Humanidad (Cinco visiones de Goya para circo), a production of the Teatro Circo Price, inspired by Francisco Goya's The Disasters of War.

== Awards and recognition ==
In 2017, for Alcalde's show ¿Y ahora qué?, which combines acrobatics, humor, and poetry, Puntocero Company received the Audience Award at the 11th edition of the Ávila International Festival of New Languages (Artescena), chosen from among six works.
