= Cable machine =

Exercise equipment

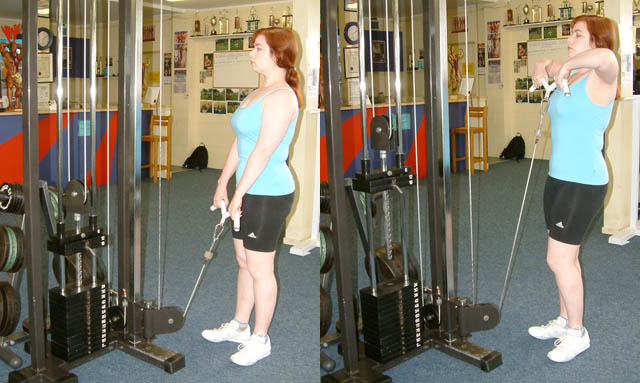
The upright row is one exercise that can be performed on the cable machine.

A cable machine is an item of equipment used in weight training or functional training. It consists of a rectangular, vertically oriented steel frame about 3 metres wide and 2 metres high, with a weight stack attached via a cable and pulley system to one or more handles. The cables that connect the handles to the weight stacks run through adjustable pulleys that can be fixed at any height. This allows a variety of exercises to be performed on the apparatus. One end of the cable is attached to a perforated steel bar that runs down the centre of the weight stack. To select the desired amount of resistance, move the metal pin into the labelled hole in the weight stack. The other end of the cable forms a loop, which allows the user to attach the appropriate handle for the exercise. Most cable machines have a minimum of 20 pounds (~9 kilograms) of resistance in order to counterbalance the weight of the typical attachment.

== See also ==
- Free weight (equipment), for example dumbbells or barbells
- Hydraulic exercise equipment
- Pneumatic exercise equipment
