= Daya Wiffen =

New Zealand netball player

Personal information
- Height: 1.74 m (5 ft 9 in)

Netball career
- Playing positions: C, WD
Years	Club team	Apps
2010-present	Central Pulse	
Years	National team	Caps
2011	NZA Squad	
- Updated on 7 December 2012

Daya Wiffen (née Pritchard) is a New Zealand netball player who plays in the ANZ Championship, playing for the Central Pulse. Daya made her debut for the Pulse in 2010, getting regular court time at both C and WD. In 2011, she was the starting C and in 2012 spent most of the season on the bench, but occasionally came on at C. She has resigned to play for the Pulse for 2013.

In 2011, she was named in the NZ Accelerant squad.
