= Taya Zinkin =

British journalist (1918–2003)

Taya Zinkin (23 September 1918 – 14 September 2003) was an English journalist and author. She was born in Zurich, Switzerland to aristocratic White Russian parents and grew up and studied in France and the United States. She wrote several books of reportage as well as books on Gandhi and caste. She was married to the ICS officer and author Maurice Zinkin. She wrote for The Economist, The Guardian, Le Monde, and Neue Zürcher Zeitung.

She is famous for the statement she made in the 1950s:

Pakistan is obsessed with India, and India is obsessed with herself.

She was an indirect cause of the 1962 Border War between India and China for she discovered the Chinese building a road in Aksai Chin and she related it privately to Jawaharlal Nehru. As a result of her journalism, she was declared persona non grata in Pakistan by President Ayub Khan.

== Publications ==
- She wrote her autobiography in three volumes:
  - Odious Child (1971),
  - Weeds Grow Fast (1973), and
  - French Memsahib (1983).
- Caste Today (London: OUP, 1965).
