= Resistance band =

Exercise equipment

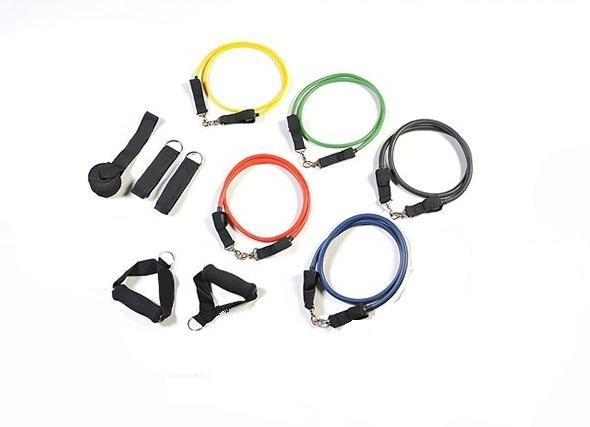

A resistance band is an elastic band used for strength training. They are also commonly used in physical therapy, specifically by convalescents of muscular injuries, including cardiac rehab patients, to allow slow rebuilding of strength.

== History ==
Originating in the early 20th century, the bands were originally made from surgical tubing and the exercises conducted for muscle rehabilitation, and resistance band training is now used widely as part of general fitness and strength training. Their flexibility in use and light weight are a significant advantage for many users.

Typically, the bands are color-coded to show different levels of resistance and users need to select an appropriate level. Code colors vary between brands.

Also, available are loop bands, as well as tubing without handles and bands, set up with handles (a common option for many purchasers). Some types allow handles to be clipped on the band or loop.

Resistance bands are simple to use, and their light weight allows people to easily carry them if travelling and continue with routine sessions for strength training.

Although there are many different forms of exercises for the bands, the resistance of the band as well as the number of repetitions are the main variables used to lower or increase the intensity of the workout. In 2014, researchers found that the bench press and the resistance band push-up, at similar stress levels, produced similar strength gains.

== Types of resistance bands ==
Some examples of types of resistance bands are:

Type of resistance band	Description	Recommended for
Therapy band	Band with no handles	Rehabilitation
Compact resistance band	Plastic handles attached to the end of the band	Upper and lower body
Flat loop band	Continuous flat loop band	Lower body
Figure-8 band	Short bands in the shape of an eight with two handles	Upper body
Ring resistance band	Circular band with two soft handles	Lower body
Lateral resistance band	Velcro ankle cuffs connected by band	Lower body
