= Outline of exercise =

Exercise is physical activity that improves health

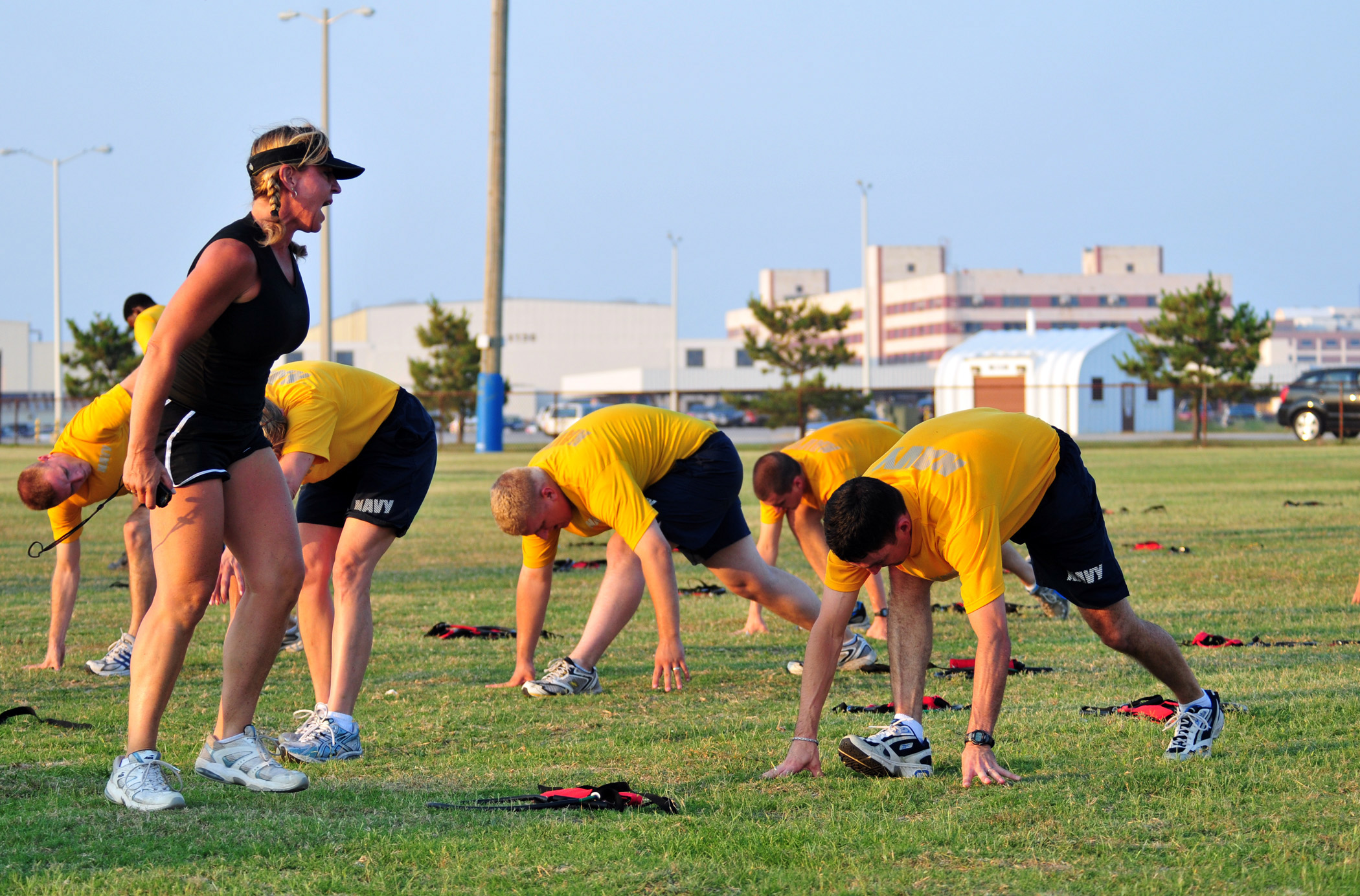
U.S. Navy sailors exercising in the presence of their physical training instructor, 2010.

The following outline is provided as an overview of and topical guide to exercise:

Exercise – any bodily activity that enhances or logs physical fitness and overall health and wellness. It is performed for various reasons including strengthening muscles and the cardiovascular system, honing athletic skills, weight loss or maintenance, as well as for the purpose of enjoyment. Frequent and regular physical exercise boosts the immune system, and helps prevent the "diseases of affluence" such as heart disease, cardiovascular disease, Type 2 diabetes, and obesity.

== Types of exercise ==
=== Aerobic exercise ===
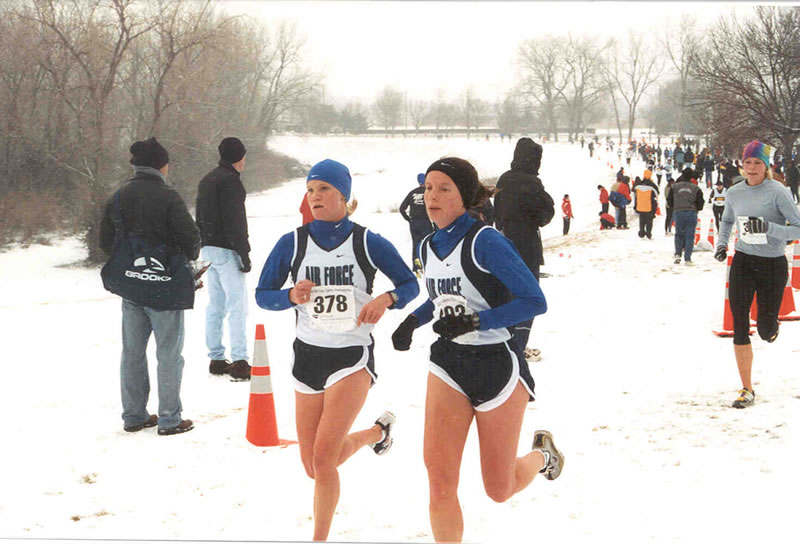
Athletes taking part in a race in a snowy park in the US

Aerobic exercise –

- Aerobics
- Circuit training
- Cycling
- Hiking
- Power walking
- Running
- Skipping rope
- Swimming
- Walking

=== Anaerobic exercise ===
Anaerobic exercise –

- Bodybuilding
- Eccentric training
- Functional training
- Sprinting
- Weight training

==== Strength training ====
Strength training (by muscle to be strengthened; (c) = compound exercise, (i) = isolated exercise)

- Abdomen and obliques (belly)
  - Crunch (i)
  - Leg raise (c)
  - Russian twist (c)
  - Sit-up (c)
- Biceps (front of upper arms)
  - Biceps curl (i)
  - Pull ups with a supinated grip
- Calves
  - Calf raise (i)
- Deltoids (shoulders)
  - Front raise (i)
  - Head stand into Handstand push-up (c)
  - Lateral raise (i)
  - Military press (c)
  - Rear delt raise (i)
  - Shoulder press (c)
  - Upright row (c)
- Forearms
  - Wrist curl (i)
  - Wrist extension (i)
- Hamstrings (back of thighs)
  - Deadlift (c)
  - Frog jumping (i)
  - Good-morning (exercise) (c)
  - Leg curl (i)
  - Squat (c)
- Lats and trapezius (back)
  - Bent-over row (c)
  - Chin-up (c)
  - Pulldown (c)
  - Pullup (c)
  - Seated row (c)
  - Shoulder shrug (i)
  - Supine row (c)
- Lower back
  - Deadlift (c)
  - Good-morning (exercise) (c)
  - Hyperextension (c)
- Pectorals (chest)
  - Bench press (c)
  - Chest fly (i)
  - Dips (c)
  - Machine fly (i)
  - Push-up (c)
- Pelvis
  - Vaginal weightlifting
- Quadriceps (front of thighs)
  - Frog Jumping (i)
  - Leg extension (i)
  - Leg press (c)
  - Lunge (c)
  - Squat (c)
- Triceps (back of upper arms)
  - Close-grip bench press (c)
  - Dips (c)
  - Push-down (exercise) (i)
  - Lying triceps extensions (i)

=== Calisthenics ===
A form of exercise consisting of a variety of movements that exercise large muscle groups.

Calisthenics

- Abdominal exercise
- Burpee (exercise)
- Calf raises
- Crunches
- Dips
- Hyperextensions
- Jumping jacks
- Leg raises
- Lunges
- Muscle-ups
- Plank
- Pull-ups
- Push-ups
- Sit-ups
- Squat jumps (Toyotas/box jumps)
- Squats

Additional calisthenics exercises that can support the muscle groups –

- Bend and reach (back and legs stretch)
- High jump (full body stretch)
- Rower (back, upper legs, and abdomen)
- Squat bend (full body stretch)

=== Stretching exercises ===
Stretching –

- Ballistic stretching
- Dynamic stretching
- PNF stretching
- Static stretching
  - Passive stretching

=== Specialized training methods ===
- Altitude training
- Ballistic training
- Boxing training
- Circuit training
- Complex training
- Cross training
- Endurance training
  - Long slow distance
- Grip strength training
- Interval training
- Plyometrics (jump training)
- Power training
- Strength training
  - High-intensity training
  - Suspension training
  - Weight training
    - Resistance training
    - Training to failure

=== Other ===
- Physical therapy
- Pilates
- Yoga

== Exercise and health ==
- Exercise trends

=== Health benefits of exercise ===
- Aerobic conditioning
- Neurobiological effects of physical exercise - improves:
  - Executive function
  - Memory
  - Stress management
- Physical fitness, including improving and maintaining these aspects of it:
  - Accuracy
  - Agility
  - Balance
  - Coordination
  - Endurance
  - Flexibility
  - Power
  - Speed
  - Stamina
  - Strength
- Prevention – exercise helps prevent:
  - Cancer
  - Drug addiction
  - Hypertension
  - Major depressive disorder
  - Neurodegenerative disorders
  - Obesity
  - Osteoporosis
  - Type 2 Diabetes

=== Dangers of exercise ===
- Cramps
- Dehydration
- Heat stroke
- Overtraining
- Sports injury
  - Sprain – pull or rupture ligaments
  - Strain – pull or rupture muscles
  - Tendon rupture
    - Achilles tendon rupture

== Terminology ==
- Buff – Having high amount of muscle mass
- Recovery – Resting time after workout to avoid muscle fatigue
- Reps – Short for repetitions, usually referred to strength training exercises
- Ripped – Having very low body fat percentage accompanied with high amount of muscle mass
- Sets – Repetitions done for certain amount followed by a period of rest
- Warm up – Initial exercises done to prepare for the main routine
- Workout – Routine of multiple exercises
- Gains - Muscle mass gained after a period of working out

Nutritional

- Amino acid
- Creatine
- Dietary supplement
- Energy drink
- Formula
- Protein
- Snack bar
- Vitamin B12
- Vitamin B2
- Vitamin B6
- Whey protein

Biological

- Joint
- Muscle
- Muscle fiber
- Muscle tissue
- Tendon

== History of exercise ==
- Aerobic exercise § History
- Bodybuilding § History
- Exercise § History
- Exercise physiology § History
- Exercise trends
- Fitness boot camp § History
- Fitness culture
- Outdoor fitness § History
- Physical culture

== Exercise equipment ==
=== Traditional ===
- Barbell
- Bench
- Cable attachments
- Chin-up bar
- Dumbbell
- Kettlebell
- Metal bar
- Punching bag
- Treadmill

=== Other ===
- Abdomenizer
- Aerobie
- Air flow ball
- Balance board
- Baoding balls
- Battling ropes
- Bicycle
- Bone exercise monitor
- BOSU
- Bowflex
- Bulgarian bag
- Bullworker
- Carva
- Communications Specification for Fitness Equipment
- Cybex International
- Elliptical trainer
- Exercise ball
- Exercise machine
- Exertris
- Fitness trail
- Foam roller
- Gamebike
- Gravity boots
- Grippers
- Gymnasticon
- Heart rate monitor
- Hydraulic Exercise Equipment
- ICON Health & Fitness
- Indoor rower
- Inversion therapy
- Isometric exercise device
- Jade egg
- Lifting stone
- Mallakhamba
- Medicine ball
- NordicTrack
- Outdoor gym
- PCGamerBike
- Pedometer
- Pole dance
- Power tower
- Range of motion (exercise machine)
- Resistance band
- Roman chair
- RowPerfect
- Scrum machine
- Slant board
- Soloflex
- Stairmaster
- Stationary bicycle
- Thighmaster
- Total Gym
- Training mask
- Treadmill
  - Treadmill desk
  - Treadmill with Vibration Isolation Stabilization
- Vaginal cone
- Wall bars
- Weighted clothing
- Wheelchair trainer
- Whole-body vibration (Galileo, Power-Plate)
- Wrist roller
- Yoni egg

more

- Barbell
- Bowflex
- Bulgarian bag
- Cable machine
- Captains of Crush Grippers
- Dip bar
- Dumbbell
- Halteres (ancient Greece)
- Indian clubs
- Iron rings
- IronMind
- Kettlebell
- Leg press
- Power cage
- Shake Weight
- Smith machine
- Soloflex
- Swimming machine
- Total Gym
- Trap bar
- TRX System
- Universal Gym Equipment
- Utility bench
- Weight machine
- York Barbell

== Physiology of exercise ==
Exercise physiology

- Aerobic exercise
- Anaerobic exercise
- Exercise-induced nausea
- Grip strength
- Muscle hypertrophy
- Overtraining
- Stretching
- Supercompensation
- Warming up
- Weight cutting
- Weight loss

=== Health monitor ===
Remote physiological monitoring

- Blood pressure
- Body fat percentage
- Heart rate
- Pulse rate
- Respiration rate

== Miscellaneous concepts ==
- Fitness professional
- Personal trainer
- Weighted clothing

== Significant people of physical fitness ==
- Arnold Schwarzenegger
- Erwan Le Corre
- Georges Hébert (b.1875-d.1957)
- Jack LaLanne (b.1914-d.2011)
- John Basedow
- Joseph Pilates (b.1883-d.1967)
- Lance Armstrong
- Robyn Landis
- Roger Bannister
- Susan Powter
- Michael Gonzalez-Wallace

== Lists ==
- List of exercise equipment
- List of weight training exercises

== See also ==
- Outline of health
- Outline of nutrition
- Outline of sports
- Sportswear
