= List of weight training exercises =

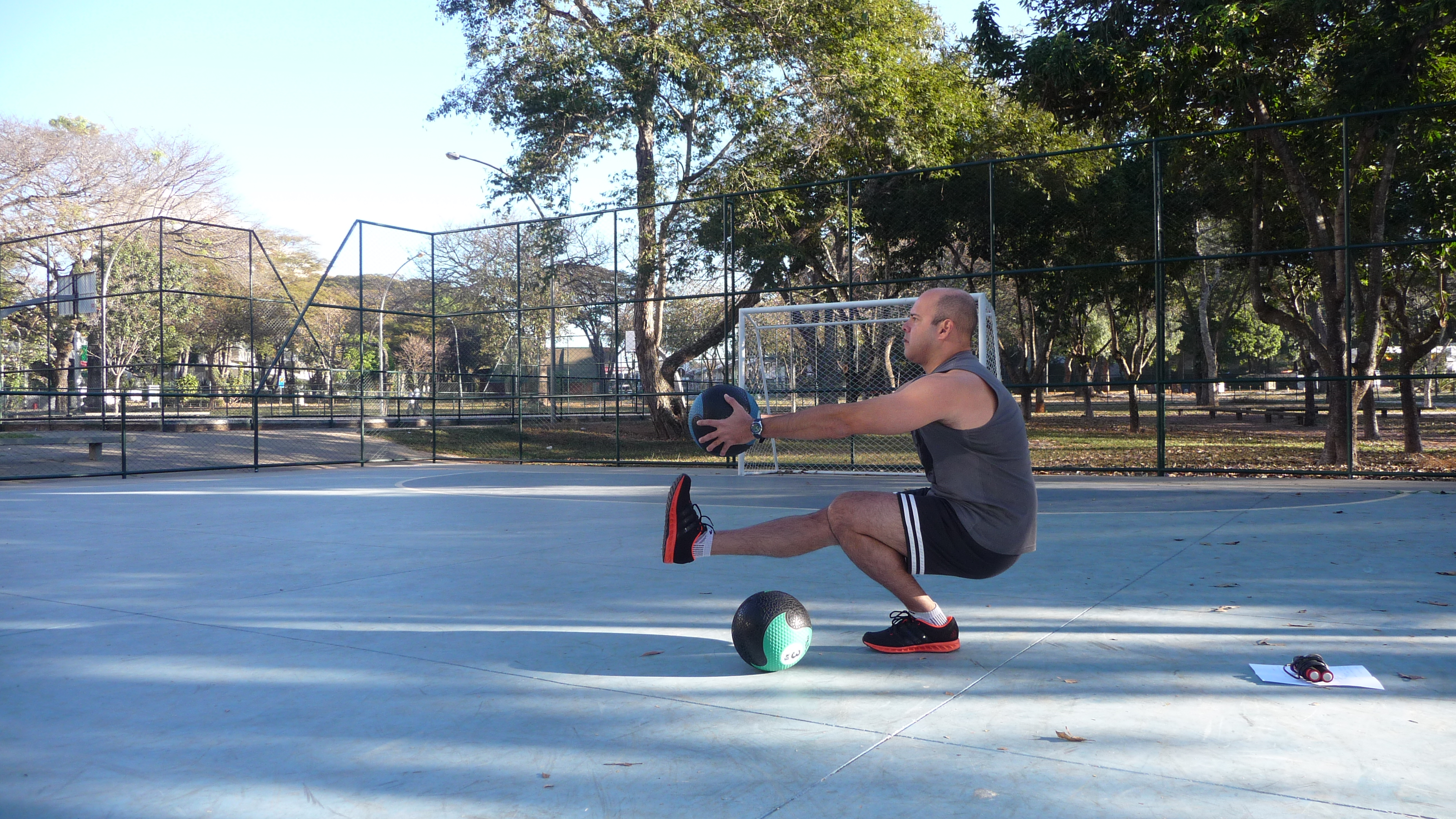
Pistol squat

This is a partial list of weight training exercises organized by muscle groups.

== Overview ==
The human body can be broken down into different muscles and muscle groups that can be worked and strengthened through exercise. This table shows the major muscles and the exercises used to work and strengthen that muscle.

Exercise	Calves	Quad- riceps	Ham- strings	Gluteus	Hips other	Lower back	Lats	Trapezius	Abdominals	Pectorals	Deltoids	Triceps	Biceps	Forearms
Bodyweight squat	Some	Yes	Some	Yes	Yes	Some			Yes					
Bulgarian split squat	Some	Yes	Some	Yes	Yes	Some			Yes					
Leg press	Some	Yes	Some	Yes										
Lunge		Yes	Yes	Yes	Yes									
Deadlift	Some	Yes	Yes	Yes	Yes	Yes		Some	Some					Some
Leg extension		Yes												
Leg curl	Some		Yes											
Standing calf raise	Yes													
Seated calf raise	Yes													
Bench press										Yes	Some	Yes		
Chest fly										Yes	Some			
Push-up										Yes	Some	Yes		
Pull-down							Yes	Some					Some	
Pull-up							Yes	Some					Some	Some
Bent-over row							Yes	Yes					Some	
Upright row								Yes			Yes		Some	
Shoulder press								Some			Yes	Yes		
Lateral raise								Some			Yes			
Shoulder shrug								Yes						Some
Push-down												Yes		
Lying triceps extension												Yes		Some
Overhead triceps extension											Some	Yes		Some
Dip										Yes	Yes	Yes		Some
Biceps curl													Yes	Some
Hammer curl													Yes	Yes
Crunch									Yes					
Russian twist									Yes					
Leg raise					Yes				Some					
Back extension	Some		Yes	Yes		Yes								

== Lower body ==
=== Quadriceps (front of thigh) ===
==== Squat ====
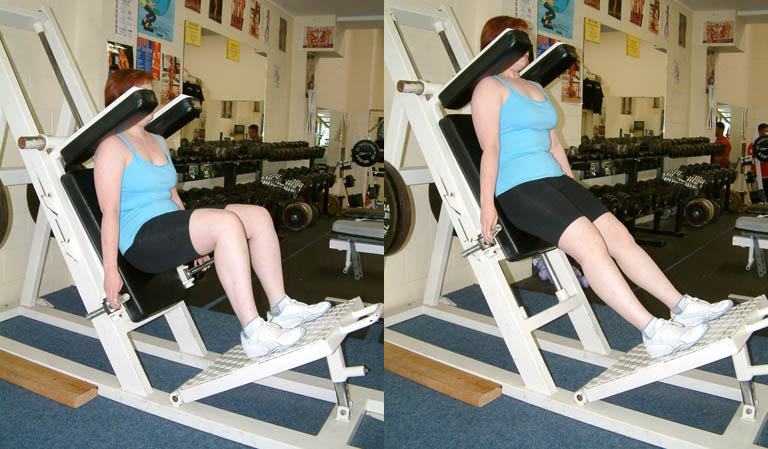
Hack squat machine

The squat is performed by squatting down with a weight held across the upper back (below the neck) and standing up straight again. This is a compound exercise that also involves the glutes (buttocks) and, to a lesser extent, the hamstrings, calves, and the lower back. Lifting belts are sometimes used to help support the lower back. The freeweight squat is one of the three powerlifting competition exercises, along with the deadlift and the bench press.

Equipment
Squats can be performed using only the practitioner's body weight. For weighted squats, a barbell is typically used, although the practitioner may instead hold dumbbells, kettlebells, or other weighted objects. Individuals uncomfortable performing freeweight squats may use a Smith machine or hack squat machine.
Major variants
Common variations include front squats, in which the weight is held across the upper chest, and box squats, in which the practitioner rests briefly on a box or bench at the bottom of the movement.

==== Leg press ====
The leg press is performed while seated by pushing a weight away from the body with the feet. It is a compound exercise that also involves the glutes and, to a lesser extent, the hamstrings and the calves. Overloading the machine can result in serious injury if the sled moves uncontrollably towards the trainer.

Equipment
Leg press machine.

==== Leg extension ====
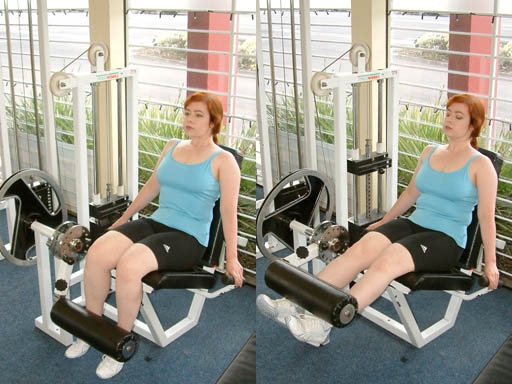
Leg extension machine

The leg extension is performed while seated by raising a weight out in front of the body with the feet. It is an isolation exercise for the quadriceps. Overtraining can cause patellar tendinitis. The leg extension serves to also strengthen the muscles around the knees and is an exercise that is preferred by physical therapists. Needs citation

Equipment
Dumbbell, cable machine or leg extension machine.

==== Wall sit ====
The wall sit, also known as a static squat, is performed by placing one's back against a wall with feet shoulder width apart, and lowering the hips until the knees and hips are both at right angles. The position is held as long as possible. The exercise is used to strengthen the quadriceps. Contrary to previous advice in this section, this exercise is NOT good for people with knee problems because the knees bear most of the load, especially when they are held at right angles (90 degrees).

Equipment
Body weight, wall or other flat vertical surface, exercise ball placed behind the back is optional as well.

=== Hamstrings (back of thigh) ===
==== Deadlift ====
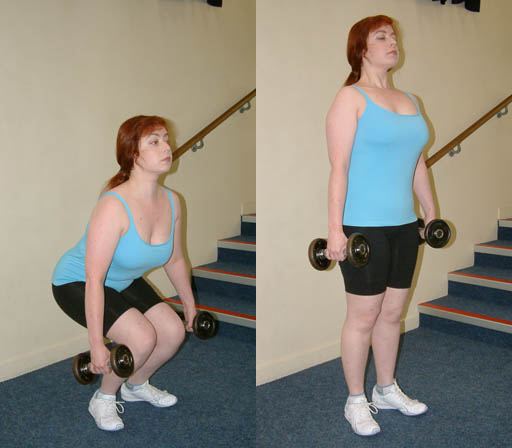
Dumbbell deadlift

The deadlift is performed by lifting a weight off of the floor until fully upright. This is a compound exercise that also involves the glutes, lower back, lats, trapezius (upper back), and, to a lesser extent, the quadriceps and the calves. Lifting belts are often used to help support the lower back. If performed with a barbell, it can be held with both hands facing backwards or with one hand facing backward and one facing forward. Both hands should not face forwards because this puts excess stress on the inner elbows.

Equipment
Dumbbells, barbell, trapbar or Smith machine.
Major variants
Sumo (wider stance to emphasise the inner thighs); stiff legged (emphasizes hamstrings); straight-legged (emphasizes lower back).

==== Stiff-legged deadlift ====
The stiff-legged deadlift is a deadlift variation where little to no knee movement occurs, increasing hamstring, glute, and lower back activation. The bar starts on the floor and the individual sets up like a normal deadlift but the knees are at a 160° angle instead of 135° on the conventional deadlift.

==== Leg curl ====
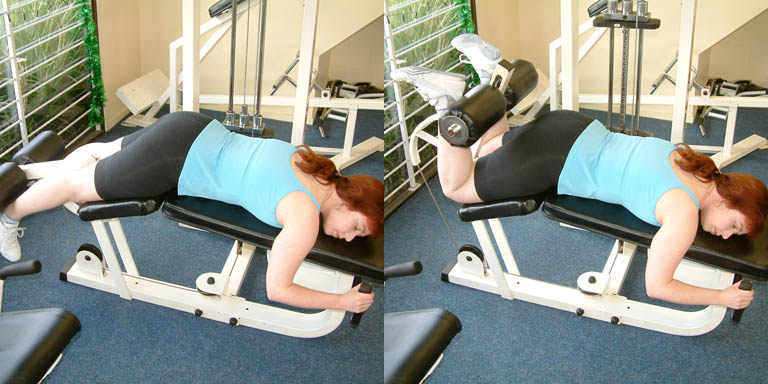
Leg curl machine

The leg curl is performed while lying face down on a bench, by raising a weight with the feet towards the buttocks. This is an isolation exercise for the hamstrings.

Equipment
Dumbbell, cable machine or leg curl machine.
Major variants
Seated (using a leg curl machine variant); standing (one leg at a time).

==== Snatch ====
The snatch is one of the two current olympic weightlifting events (the other being the clean and jerk). The essence of the event is to lift a barbell from the platform to locked arms overhead in a smooth continuous movement. The barbell is pulled as high as the lifter can manage (typically to mid [ chest] height) (the pull) at which point the barbell is flipped overhead. With relatively light weights (as in the "power snatch") locking of the arms may not require rebending the knees. However, as performed in contests, the weight is always heavy enough to demand that the lifter receive the bar in a squatting position, while at the same time flipping the weight so it moves in an arc directly overhead to locked arms. When the lifter is secure in this position, he rises (overhead squat), completing the lift.

=== Bulgarian split squats ===
The Bulgarian split squat is a squat variation and is performed by resting the back foot on an elevated surface, such as a bench, with your other foot out in front of you on the floor. With a dumbbell in hand or body weight, you bend and lower your front leg until the dumbbell reaches the floor, and then using your front leg, push up into starting position. This exercise targets the hamstrings, glutes, and quadriceps, making it a great full-body movement. This movement also requires good balance and stability, so core strength is also an important aspect.

Equipment required
Bench, dumbbell or body weight.
Variations
leaning the upper body forward slightly puts more stress on the glutes, while keeping the body straight upright targets more quadriceps.

=== Calves ===
==== Standing calf raise ====
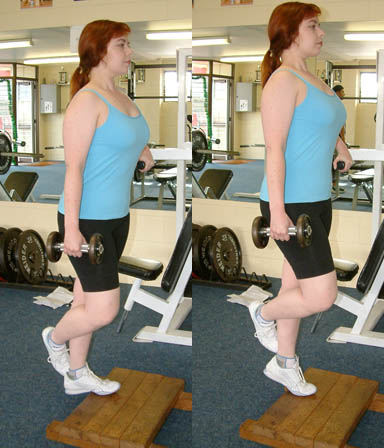
Dumbbell single-leg standing calf raise

The standing calf raise is performed by plantarflexing the feet to lift the body. If a weight is used, then it rests upon the shoulders, or is held in the hand(s). This is an isolation exercise for the calves; it particularly emphasises the gastrocnemius muscle, and recruits the soleus muscle.

Equipment
Body weight, dumbbells, barbell, Smith machine or standing calf raise machine.
Major variants
One leg (the other is held off the ground); donkey calf raise (bent over with a weight or machine pad on the lower back).

==== Seated calf raise ====
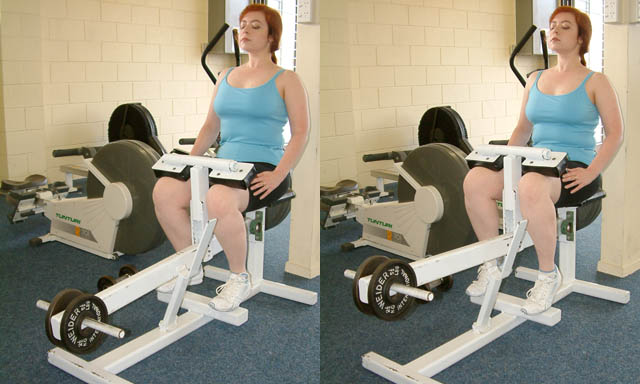
Seated calf raise machine

The seated calf raise is performed by flexing the feet to lift a weight held on the knees. This is an isolation exercise for the calves, and particularly emphasises the soleus muscle.

Equipment
Barbell or seated calf raise machine; can also be done on a leg press machine.

== Upper body ==
=== Pectorals (chest) ===
Smith machine bench press

- The bench press or dumbbell bench-press is performed while lying face up on a bench, by pushing a weight away from the chest. This is a compound exercise that also involves the triceps and the front deltoids, also recruits the upper and lower back muscles, and traps. The bench press is the king of all upper body exercises and is one of the most popular chest exercises in the world. It is the final exercise in 'The big 3'.
  - Equipment: dumbbells, barbell, Smith machine or bench press machine.
  - Major variants: incline ~ (more emphasis on the upper pectorals), decline ~ (more emphasis on the lower pectorals), narrow grip ~ (more emphasis on the triceps), push-up (face down using the body weight), neck press (with the bar over the neck, to isolate the pectorals), vertical dips (using parallel dip bars) or horizontal dips (using two benches with arms on the near bench and feet on the far bench, and dropping the buttocks to the floor and pushing back up.)

Dumbbell flye

- The chest fly is performed while lying face up on a bench or standing up, with arms outspread holding weights, by bringing the arms together above the chest. This is a compound exercise for the pectorals. Other muscles worked include deltoids, triceps, and forearms.
  - Equipment: dumbbells, cable machine or "pec deck" machine.
  - Major variants: incline ~ (more emphasis on the upper pectorals), decline ~ (more emphasis on the lower pectorals), cable crossover.
- Cable crossovers
- Dips

=== Lats (mid back) ===
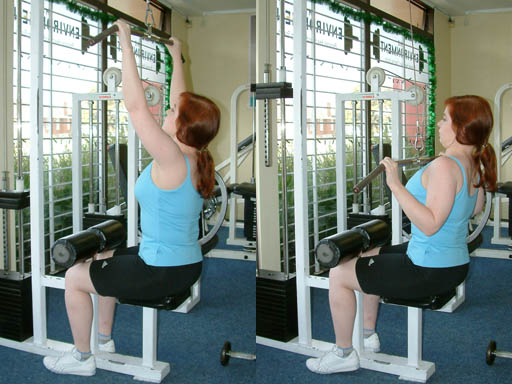
Pulldown machine

- The pulldown is performed while seated by pulling a wide bar down towards the upper chest or behind the neck. This is a compound exercise that also involves the biceps, forearms, and the rear deltoids.
  - Equipment: cable machine or pulldown machine.
  - Major variants: chin-up or pullup (using the body weight while hanging from a high bar), close grip ~ (more emphasis on the lower lats), reverse grip ~ (more emphasis on the biceps).
- The Pull-up is performed by hanging from a chin-up bar above head height with the palms facing forward (supinated) and pulling the body up so the chin reaches or passes the bar. The pull-up is a compound exercise that also involves the biceps, forearms, traps, and the rear deltoids. A chin-up (palms facing backwards) places more emphasis on the biceps and a wide grip pullup places more emphasis on the lats. As beginners of this exercise are often unable to lift their own bodyweight, a chin-up machine can be used with counterweights to assist them in the lift.
  - Equipment: chin-up bar or chin-up machine.

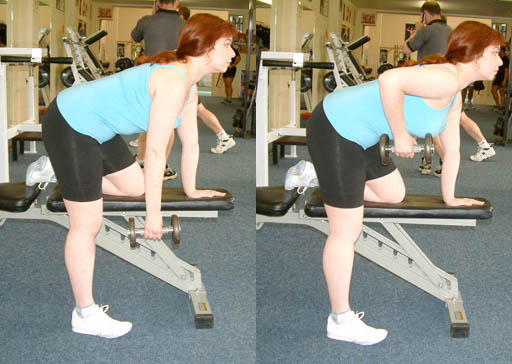
Dumbbell bent-over row

- The bent-over row is performed while leaning over, holding a weight hanging down in one hand or both hands, by pulling it up towards the abdomen. This is a compound exercise that also involves the biceps, forearms, traps, and the rear deltoids. The torso is unsupported in some variants of this exercise, in which case lifting belts are often used to help support the lower back.
  - Equipment: dumbbell, barbell, Smith machine or T-bar machine.
  - Major variants: cable row (using a cable machine while seated).

=== Deltoids (shoulders) ===
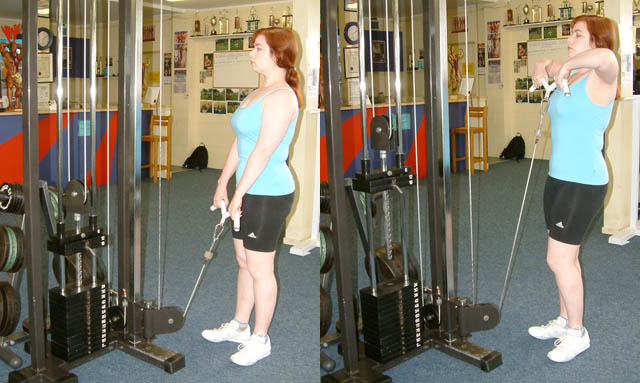
Cable machine upright row

- The upright row is performed while standing, holding a weight hanging down in the hands, by lifting it straight up to the collarbone. This is a compound exercise that also involves the trapezius, upper back, forearms, triceps, and the biceps. The narrower the grip the more the trapezius muscles are exercised.
  - Upright rows are prone to injure the shoulder through internal rotation and elevation of the ball and socket joint.
  - Equipment: dumbbells, barbell, Smith machine or cable machine.

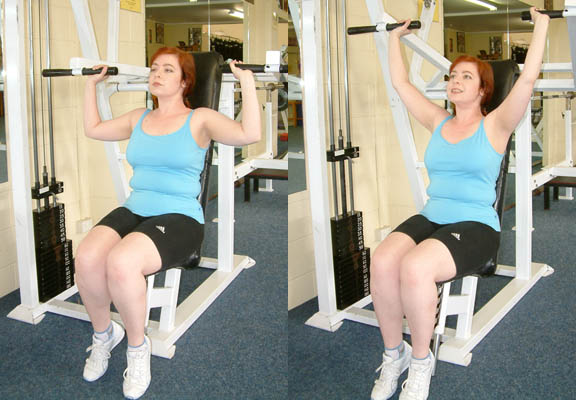
Shoulder press machine

- The shoulder press is performed while seated, or standing by lowering a weight held above the head to just above the shoulders, and then raising it again. It can be performed with both arms, or one arm at a time. This is a compound exercise that also involves the trapezius and the triceps.
  - Major variants: 360 Degree Shoulder Press (wrists are rotated while weights are lifted, then weights are lowered in front of the head before being rotated back to the first position).
- The military press is similar to the shoulder press but is performed while standing with the feet together. (It is named "military" because of the similarity in appearance to the "at attention" position used in most militaries) Unlike the seated shoulder press, the military press involves the majority of the muscles of the core as stabilizers to keep the body rigid and upright, and is thus a more effective compound exercise.
  - Equipment: dumbbells, kettlebells, barbell, Smith machine or shoulder press machine.
  - Major variants: Arnold Press (dumbbells are raised while rotating the palms outwards).

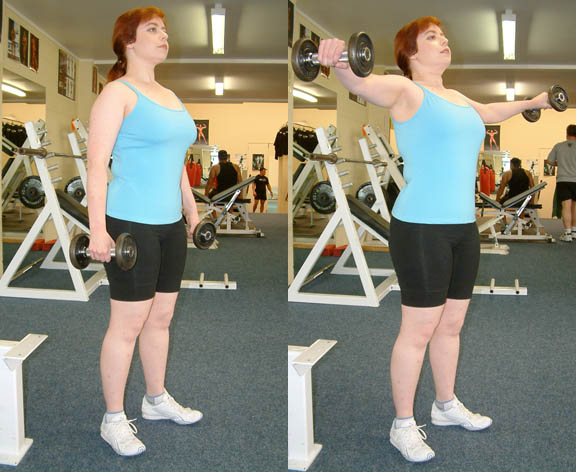
Dumbbell lateral raise

- The lateral raise (or shoulder fly) is performed while standing or seated, with hands hanging down holding weights, by lifting them out to the sides until just below the level of the shoulders. A slight variation in the lifts can hit the deltoids even harder, while moving upwards, just turn the hands slightly downwards, keeping the last finger higher than the thumb. This is an isolation exercise for the deltoids. Also works the forearms and traps.
  - Equipment: dumbbells, cable machine or lateral raise machine.
  - Major variants: front raise (lift weights out to the front; emphasis is on the front deltoids), bent-over ~ (emphasis is on the rear deltoids), 180 degree lateral raise (weights are held slightly in front of the body and lifted over the head in a circular motion).

=== Triceps (back of arms) ===
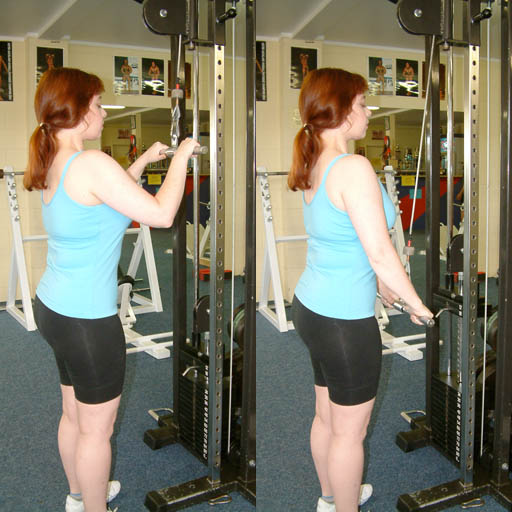
Cable machine pushdown

- The pushdown is performed while standing by pushing down on a bar held at the level of the upper chest. It is important to keep the elbows at shoulder width and in line with shoulder/legs. In other words, elbows position should not change while moving the forearm pushes down the bar. This is an isolation exercise for the triceps.
  - Equipment: cable machine or pulldown machine.

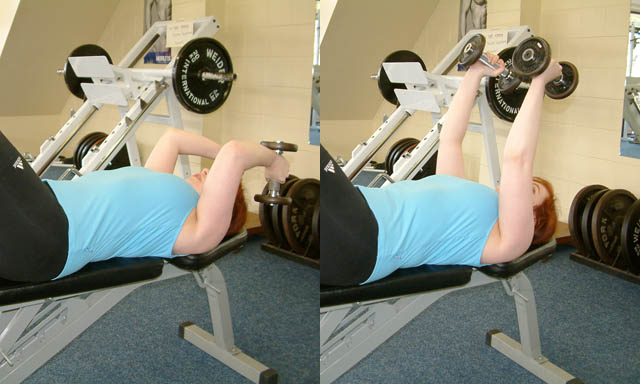
Lying dumbbell triceps extension demonstrating no arching of back at top of movement

- The triceps extension is performed while standing or seated, by lowering a weight held above the head (keeping the upper arms motionless), and then raising it again. It can be performed with both arms, or one arm at a time. This is an isolation exercise for the triceps. It is also known as the french curl.
  - Equipment: dumbbell(s), barbell, cable machine or triceps extension machine.
  - Major variants: lying ~ (lying face up with the weights over the face), kickback (bent over with the upper arm parallel to the torso).

=== Biceps (front of arms) ===
Dumbbell biceps curl on the preacher bench using momentum of body to help lift weights

- The Preacher curl is performed while standing or seated, with hands hanging down holding weights (palms facing forwards), by curling them up to the shoulders. It can be performed with both arms, or one arm at a time.
- Standing barbell curl
- Alternating rotating dumbbell curl
- Hammer curl
- The Zottmann curl gives a stronger focus to forearm training compared to the traditional curl.

== Waist ==
=== Abdominals ===
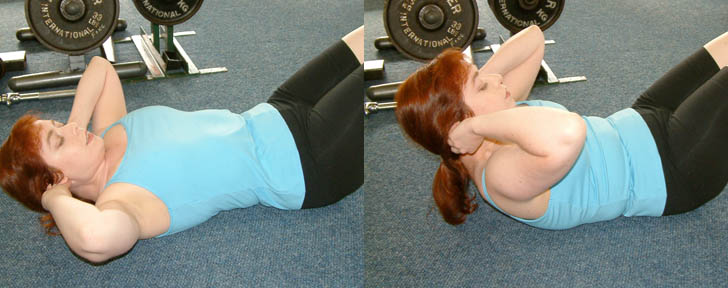
Crunch

- The crunch is performed while lying face up on the floor with knees bent, by curling the shoulders up towards the pelvis. This is an isolation exercise for the abdominals.
  - Equipment: body weight, dumbbell or crunch machine.
  - Major variants: reverse ~ (curling the pelvis towards the shoulders), twisting ~ or side ~ (lifting one shoulder at a time; emphasis is on the obliques), cable ~ (pulling down on a cable machine while kneeling), sit-up ~ (have [chest] touch your knees), vertical crunch (propping up to dangle legs and pulling knees to the [ chest] or keeping legs straight and pulling up legs to a 90 degree position). Reverse hanging crunch (using gravity boots or slings to hang head down and pulling to a 90 or 180 degree form)

Seated leg raise

- The leg raise is performed while sitting on a bench or flat on the floor by raising the knees towards the shoulders, or legs to a vertical upright position. This is a compound exercise that also involves the hip flexors.
  - Equipment: body weight or dumbbell.
  - Major variants: hanging ~ (hanging from a high bar), side ~ (lying on side), knee raise (lying on back, drawing knees to chest).
- The Russian twist is a type of exercise that is used to work the abdomen muscles by performing a twisting motion on the abdomen. This exercise is performed sitting on the floor with knees bent like in a "sit-up" position with the back typically kept off the floor at an angle of 45°. In this position, the extended arms are swung from one side to another in a twisting motion with or without weight.
  - Equipment: body weight, kettlebell, medicine ball, or dumbbell.
  - Major variants: back kept off the floor at 45° angle, back rested on exercise ball, feet resting on the floor, anchored or kept off the floor.

=== Lower back ===
==== Back extension ====
Back extension on a Roman chair

The back extension is performed while lying face down partway along a flat or angled bench, so that the hips are supported and the heels secured, by bending down at the waist and then straightening up again. This is a compound exercise that also involves the glutes.

Equipment
Body weight, dumbbell or back extension machine.
Major variants
Without bench (lying face down on the floor).

==== Deadlift ====
The deadlift is a very effective compound exercise for strengthening the lower back, but also exercises many other major muscle groups, including quads, hamstrings and abdominals. It is a challenging exercise, as poor form or execution can cause serious injury. A deadlift is performed by grasping a dead weight on the floor and, while keeping the back very straight, standing up by contracting the erector spinae (primary lower back muscle). When performed correctly, the role of the arms in the deadlift is only that of cables attaching the weight to the body; the musculature of the arms should not be used to lift the weight. There is no movement more basic to everyday life than picking a dead weight up off of the floor, and for this reason focusing on improving one's deadlift will help prevent back injuries.

Wrong technique and forward lean posture with a flexed spine can lead to discal injuries of the lower back. Correct technical performance with a slightly hollow or extended back and a hip hinge to keep the normal curvature of the spine is of utmost importance.

==== Good-morning ====
The good-morning is a weight training exercise in which a barbell, two dumbbells, or no weight at all is held on the shoulders, behind the head. The person bends forward and bows at the hips and recovers to upright. The good-morning is so called because the movement resembles bowing to greet someone. It involves the hamstrings but is primarily used to strengthen the lower back; the degree of knee bend used will change the focus – nearly straight-legged involving the hamstrings most.

Incorrect technique and a forward leaning posture with a flexed spine can lead to disc damage in the lower back. Proper technique with a slightly hollow or extended back to maintain the normal curvature of the spine is paramount.

== See also ==
- List of exercise activities
