= Power rack =

Weight training equipment

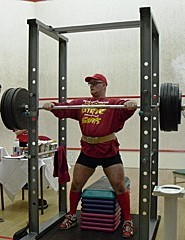
A man preparing to do box squats in a power rack

A power rack (also known as a power cage, squat cage or squat rack) is a piece of weight training equipment that functions as a mechanical spotter for free weight barbell exercises without the movement restrictions imposed by equipment such as the Smith machine. Its general design is four upright posts with two adjustable horizontal bar catches (also called "supports," "rails" or "pins") on each side. Many power racks also have accessory attachments, such as a chin-up bar, pulldown cable attachment, or pegs for storing weight plates.

== Purpose ==
The power rack serves several purposes. Best among them is safety: for instance, in the bench press, placing the bar catches, also known as spotter arms, right above the lifter's chest will prevent the barbell from crushing the athlete in the case of muscular fatigue or other loss of control of the bar. In the case of squats, catches placed just below the lowest position of the squat allow the lifter to "dump" the weight safely.

The power rack is also useful for performing limited-range exercises, often involving heavier weights than their full-range equivalents. These include rack pulls, a variation of the deadlift where the starting point of the bar is higher than a conventional deadlift, and rack lockouts, a bench press variation limited to just the upper portion of the lift (the "lockout").

== History ==
Power racks were invented by Bob Peoples and popularized in the 1960s, when Terry Todd and Dr. Craig Whitehead used them to test their "theory of maximum fatigue." Peary Rader then devoted a long article to the subject in his Iron Man magazine., Peary Rader mentions that similar ideas were circulating for around two decades, even though they were not always called the power rack.

A newer form of power rack that has become popular is the half rack, which utilizes two or four vertical posts (with cantilevered bar catches) that the user stands in front of, in contrast to standing in the center of four posts in a conventional rack. The first half racks were developed at the University of Nebraska–Lincoln.
