= Louie Simmons =

American powerlifter (1947–2022)

Personal information
- Nationality: American
- Born: October 12, 1947
- Died: March 24, 2022 (aged 74)
- Occupation(s): Strength and conditioning coach, Business owner
- Website: www.westside-barbell.com

Sport
- Country: United States
- Sport: Powerlifting

Louie Simmons (October 12, 1947 – March 24, 2022) was an American powerlifter and strength coach. He was active as a powerlifter and coach for more than fifty years. Simmons was the founder of Westside Barbell and has developed several training protocols, including the "Conjugate Method". He is also credited with inventing training machines for reverse hyper-extensions and belt squats. In the US powerlifting community he was referred to as the "Godfather of powerlifting".

== Career ==
Simmons grew up in Reynoldsburg and Columbus, Ohio. After being expelled from school he worked in construction and exercised regularly, entering his first powerlifting competition in 1966. He would compete in powerlifting for over 50 years. Simmons achieved a 920 pounds (420 kg) squat, a 600 pounds (270 kg) bench press, and a 722 pounds (327 kg) deadlift over the age of 50 years. He totaled Elite in five different weight classes over almost four decades. Simmons is one of only five lifters to total Elite in five different powerlifting weight classes. He totalled Elite in various power-lifting organizations.

Simmons publicly defended the use of performance enhancing drugs to achieve strength goals and muscle growth, including his own consistent use of anabolic steroids since 1970, stating to Joe Rogan in a 2016 podcast, "I went on anabolics January 1970. And so, what is this, 2016? I've never been off 'em." "See, it's not against the rules to take drugs. It's against the rules to get caught taking drugs."

Despite Simmons' views on performance enhancing drugs, his students in the sport of powerlifting continue to cite his methods as fundamental to their training long after they leave his gym. Simmons also worked as a strength consultant with collegiate and professional sports teams and his training methods are featured in the CrossFit Powerlifting certificate course. His articles on training methods were a regular feature in Powerlifting USA. Simmons was the founder and owner of Westside Barbell, a private gym in Columbus, Ohio. Membership is by invitation only.

== Westside Barbell methods ==
Louie has developed and popularized a system of training named after the Westside Barbell gym, sometimes referred to as the Conjugate Method. The system adapts Soviet and Bulgarian training protocols for powerlifting needs and is well known for its use of resistance bands and chains to modify various strength exercises. Simmons' method has been used to train athletes in a variety of sports reliant on strength development, including powerlifting, track and field, combat sports, and football.

Simmons claims that he invented and developed special barbell exercises that are used to target weaknesses in the competition lifts. Upper- and lower-body special exercises are rotated frequently (at least every three weeks) on the principle that training the same special exercise for too long will be counterproductive. The training system emphasizes the variety of special exercises. Different lifts can be performed, for example the good-morning instead of the squat. Competition lifts can be altered by increasing or decreasing the range of motion, such as squatting to a low or high box, performing partial range-of-motion bench presses, using wooden boards to shorten the stroke, or deadlifting from blocks or pins in a power cage. The conventional barbell can be replaced with specialty bars such as a cambered bar, safety squat bar, or Swiss bar.

The loading of special exercises is designed to simultaneously increase strength and speed every week. Two "Max Effort" (ME) sessions a week, one each for the upper and lower body, require training with maximally heavy weights on the special exercises described above. Two "Dynamic Effort" (DE) sessions a week, again, one each for upper and lower body, call for training with sub-maximal weights but accelerating as much as possible in the upwards portion of the lift. By alternating ME and DE sessions, the conjugate sequence system is meant as an alternative to traditional Western periodization in strength training, in which only one quality, such as hypertrophy, speed, or strength, is developed in a given week. This is in opposition to the conjugate sequence system used by Soviet athletes which trains one main motor ability at a time while maintaining the rest.

The most common template for this method revolves around three methods of weight training used in conjunction with one another. These three methods are:

- Overcoming maximal resistance that causes maximal or near maximal muscle tension (maximal effort method).
- Using considerably less than maximal resistance until fatigue causes one to fail (repeated effort method).
- Using sub maximal weights accompanied by maximal speed (dynamic method).

== Special equipment ==
In addition to developing special exercises, Simmons also developed specialized equipment and machines to most efficiently and effectively build strength not achievable by commercial gym equipment, most notably the Reverse Hyperextension Machine.
