= Pushdown =

Pushdown may refer to:

- Pushdown automaton, a concept in theoretical computer science
  - More generally, anything relating to a stack
- Push-down (exercise), a strength-training exercise
