= Bob Peoples =

American powerlifter (1910–1992)

Personal information
- Nationality: American
- Citizenship: United States
- Born: August 2, 1910 Johnson City, Tennessee, U.S.
- Died: June 19, 1992 (aged 81)
- Occupations: Powerlifter, farmer

Sport
- Country: United States
- Sport: Powerlifting

Bob Peoples was an American powerlifter and farmer, known for breaking the record for world's heaviest deadlift.

Peoples first set the Light-heavyweight deadlift world record in 1946 lifting 651 lbs at a bodyweight of 175 lbs. He later beat his own record in 1947 with a lift of 710 lbs at a body weight of 185 lbs. Then in 1949 he set a long standing record lifting 725.75 lbs at a body weight of 181 lbs.

In addition to his records Bob is noted for having invented the power rack, lifting straps and popularizing the conscious use of the rounded-back style in the deadlift.

Bob's original Power rack and Wooden Barbell are displayed at the H.J. Lutcher Stark Center for Physical Culture and Sports.
