= Calf raises =

Exercise for muscles of the lower leg

Calf raises are a method of exercising the triceps surae (gastrocnemius and soleus), tibialis posterior, and peroneal muscles of the lower leg. The movement performed is plantar flexion, also called ankle extension.

== Bent-knee ==
Calf raises are sometimes done with a flexed knee, usually roughly 90 degrees. This lessens the stretch in the gastrocnemius (a knee flexor), so the movement is done to emphasize the soleus.

=== Seated ===
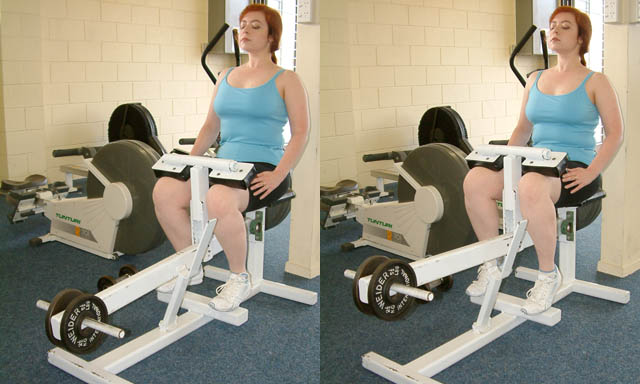
Seated calf raise

Bent-knee calf raises are frequently done in a seated position for comfort. Since the weight of the upper body is rested on the seat, resistance is frequently added. Using bodyweight, one leg could be draped across the other (through external rotation) to exercise unilaterally and double the weight lifted.

It can also be executed by using a weight, such as a barbell, to provide resistance to the action of the calf muscles. The exercise is performed from a seated position while the weight rests on the upper leg, just above the knee. The person engaged in this exercise lifts the weight by pushing down on the balls of the feet.

Due to the discomfort of higher weights on a bar, barbells used for seated calf raises are frequently padded or wrapped in a towel. There are also seated calf raise machines designed using levers that have pads built into them to protect the patella, quadriceps and tendons.

This exercise is more commonly used for the soleus since the gastrocnemius does not work as much in a bent knee position.

=== Bridging ===
Bridging exercises are done with a flexed knee to lessen the stretch on the hamstring (a knee flexor) and focus the hip extension work on the gluteus maximus. In that same respect, the reduced knee flexion makes plantar flexion work comparable to a seated calf raise, due to the lessened stretch on the gastrocnemius (like the hamstring, also a knee flexor).

Since the pelvis is in the air, its weight can be shifted onto the feet allowing greater resistance.

This is an awkward exercise due to the reduced stability and difficulty in adding resistance. If one were to raise a leg, the use of the arms to avoid falling sideways would often be necessary. If one were to place a padded barbell on the upper quadriceps to add resistance, this would make the arms less able to stabilize, requiring core stabilization.

== Straight-knee ==
Pushing with the foot with a straighter knee stretches the gastrocnemius more, these movements incorporate it better. The soleus still contributes, usually allowing people to lift more weight.

=== Standing ===
Standing bilateral calf raise with machine start

Standing bilateral calf raise with machine end

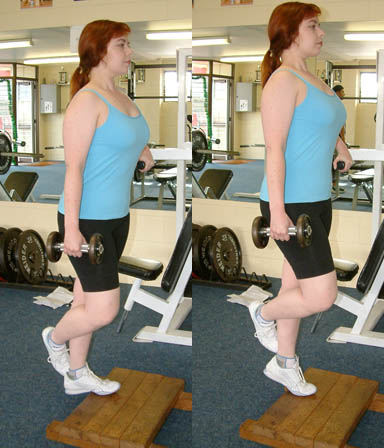
Standing unilateral calf raise with a dumbbell

Standing calf raises are executed with one or both feet. They are frequently done on a raised surface with the heel lower than the toes to allow a greater stretch on the working muscles. The exercise is performed by raising the heel as far as possible. Weights or other methods of providing resistance are commonly used, but the exercise is also effective with bodyweight alone.

Balance may become a difficulty with free-standing calf raises, especially with older one-legged variations. Due to this, it is common to hang on to something or lean the hand against a wall for stability. They are also performed using Smith machines or using machines specially designed for calf raises with padded anchors for the weight that rests on the shoulders.

=== Leg press ===
A straight-knee calf raise is often done using the leg press machine. The sledge is kept nearly locked out and the exerciser is meant to keep the hip and knee joints immobile. This is not a bodyweight exercise, the only body part actually being lifted is the small weight of the foot. The resistance comes from the sledge.

A leg press is easy to stabilize and the safety bar is kept in place so if the person can not lift it, it should come down safely.

== Exercise notes ==
The gastrocnemius is made up of fast-twitch muscle fibres, which benefit more from heavy loads and low reps on the standing calf raise, while the soleus is a slow-twitch muscle and benefits from higher reps and lower loads on the seated calf raise. Its also shown that using lengthened partials on calf raises increase hypertrophy in the calf muscles rather than a full range of motion.
