= Spotting (weight training) =

Assisting technique in weight training

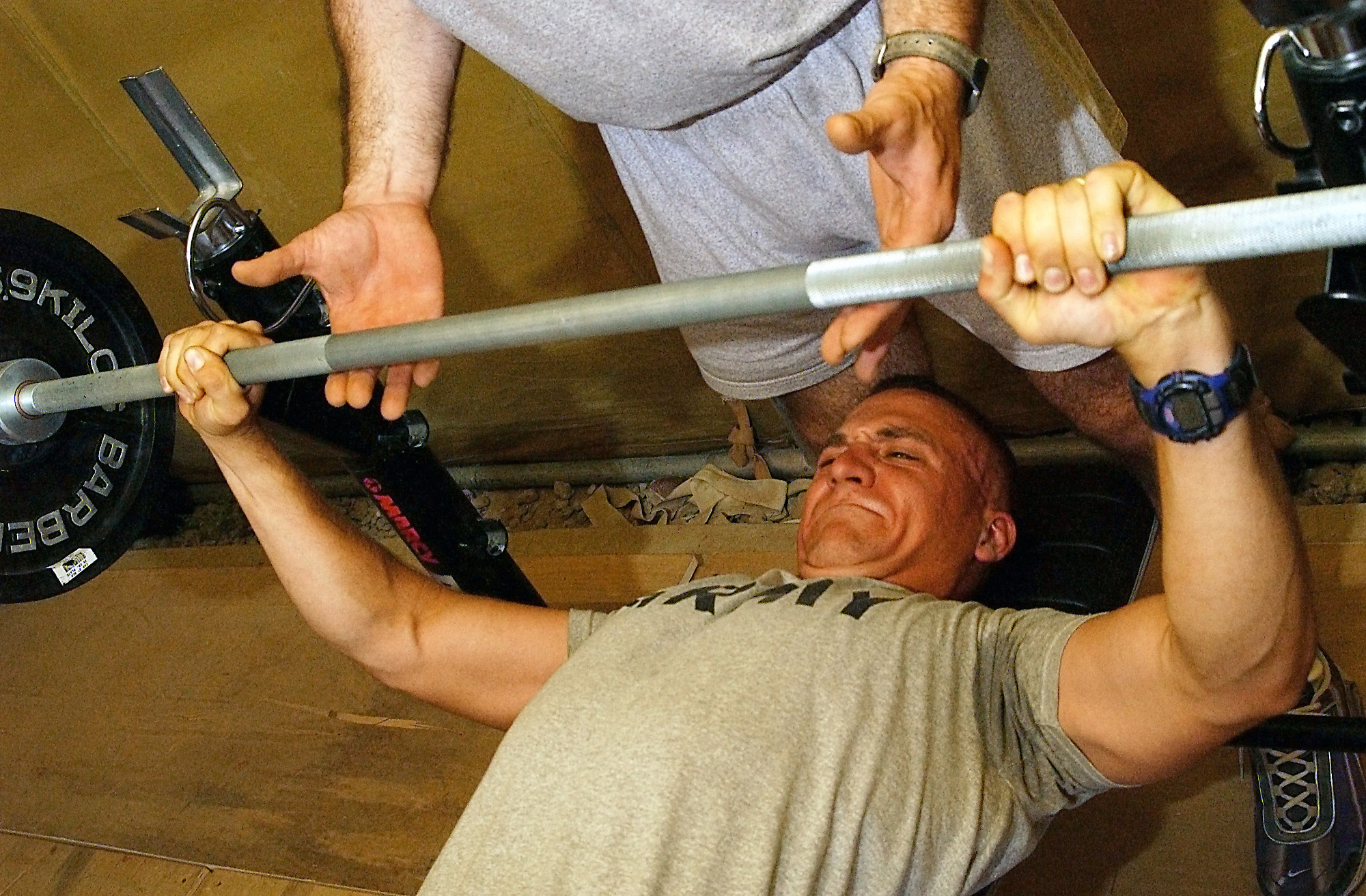
A man (lying down) performs a bench press with a spotter.

Spotting in weight or resistance training is the act of supporting another person during a particular exercise, with an emphasis on allowing the participant to lift or push more than they could normally do safely. Correct spotting involves knowing when to intervene and assist with a lift, and encouraging a training partner to push beyond the point in which they would normally 'rack' the weight (return it to its stationary position).

== Exercises ==
=== Bench Press ===
Spotting is particularly prevalent when performing the bench press. Because of the risks of lifting a heavy weight in the supine position, a lifter will often ask for a spot unless they are completely confident that the lift will not be failed. While a spotter may prevent injury, a lifter may become too dependent on the spotter, and not realize the degree that the spotter is assisting them. This is sometimes jocularly referred to as the "two man bench press".

=== Barbell Squat ===
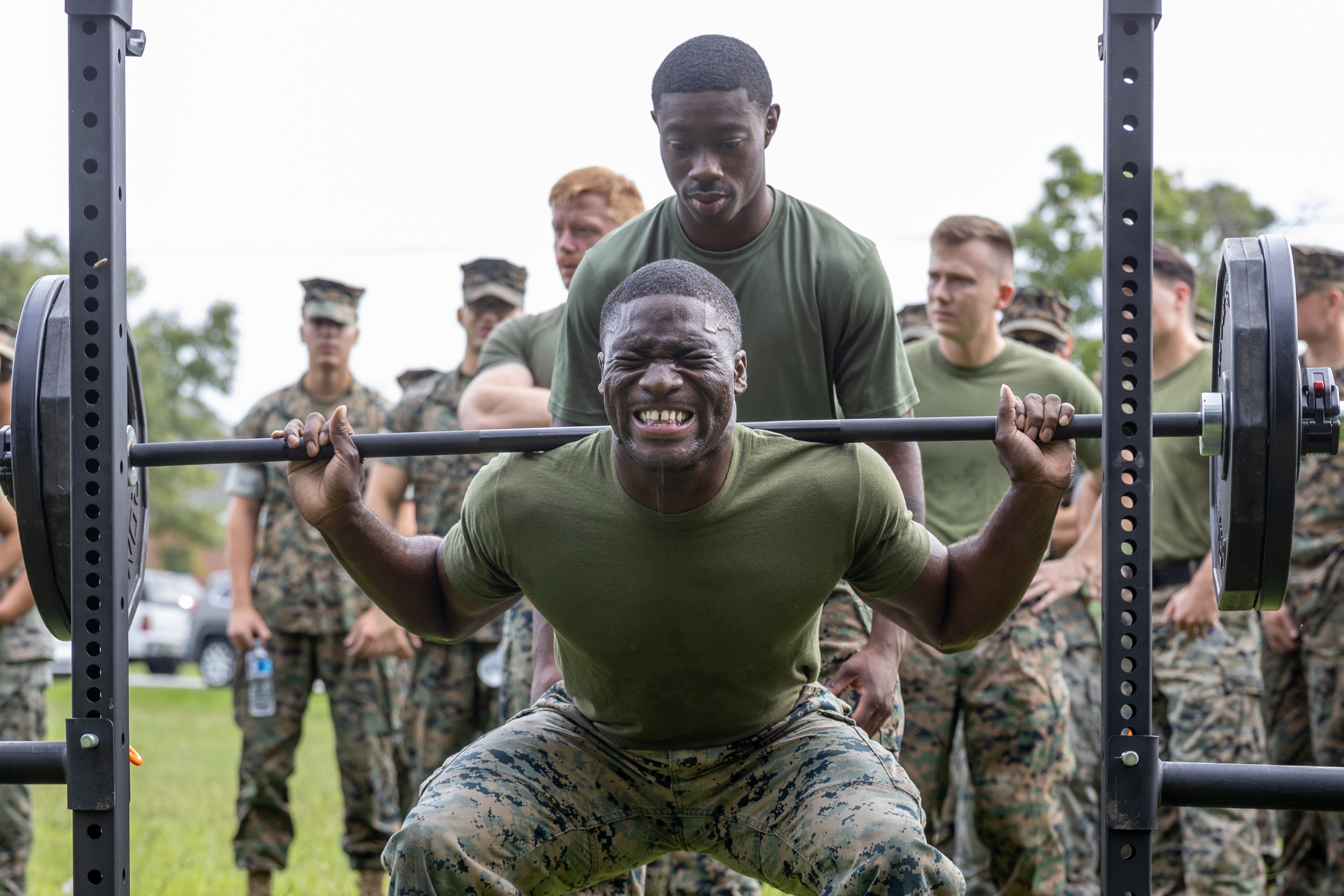
A US Marine spots a barbell squatter

Barbell squats should be spotted by two spotters, one at each end of the bar. In the event of a missed lift, each spotter hooks an elbow under the end of the bar, and takes the plates in both hands. Care must be taken to keep the assistance balanced and coordinated to avoid uneven deloading of the weight and possible torsion injury.

If two spotters are unavailable, a single spotter can assist by taking some of the weight off the bar allowing the lifter to return the weight to the rack. A single spotter is referred to as a 'Spinks'. Unlike other exercises this exercise does not present much of a chance for the spotters to assist the lifter, as the spotters only intercede in the event of a missed lift.

=== Skull Crushers ===
Another exercise to utilize a spotter would be the triceps exercise skull crushers in which the lifter lowers an E-Z bar towards their head while lying flat on the bench. The spotter will be standing behind the individual and moving their hands approximately 6 inches below the bar so that they can catch it in the event of the lifter running out of energy.

=== Military Press ===
Additionally, some people prefer to have a spotter present during the barbell military press or barbell push press (two very similar exercises). This exercise involves lifting a considerable amount of weight about the head. During this exercise the spotter will assist in “lifting off” the bar from the racked position. Then the spotter will keep his/her hands about 6 inches under the bar. This allows the spotter to assist when the lifter runs out of energy, but most importantly allows the spotter to catch the weight if the lifter cannot lift any more. A spotter may not be preferred, however, because the risk of injury is lower and it is easier to drop the weight on the ground if the lifter loses control of the barbell.
