= Upright row =

Weight training exercise

The upright row is a weight training exercise performed by holding a weight with an overhand grip and lifting it straight up to the collarbone. This is a compound exercise that involves the trapezius, the deltoids and the biceps. The narrower the grip the more the trapezius muscles are exercised, as opposed to the deltoids.

Barbells, dumbbells, kettlebells or a cable machine can be used.

Due to the amount of internal rotation of the humerus during this movement, this exercise may worsen shoulder impingement syndrome.

== Etymology ==
In the 1970s there are examples of this exercise being referred to as pullups. This is no longer common, and this term is now mostly used to refer to the exercise involving pulling the body up to a bar.

== Gallery ==
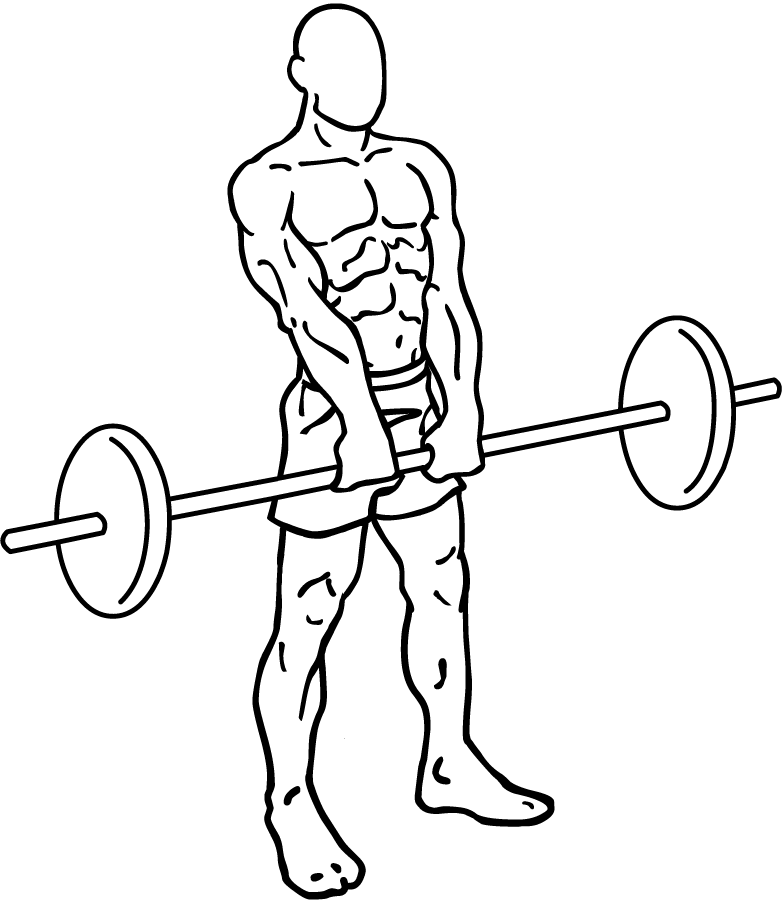
Barbell start

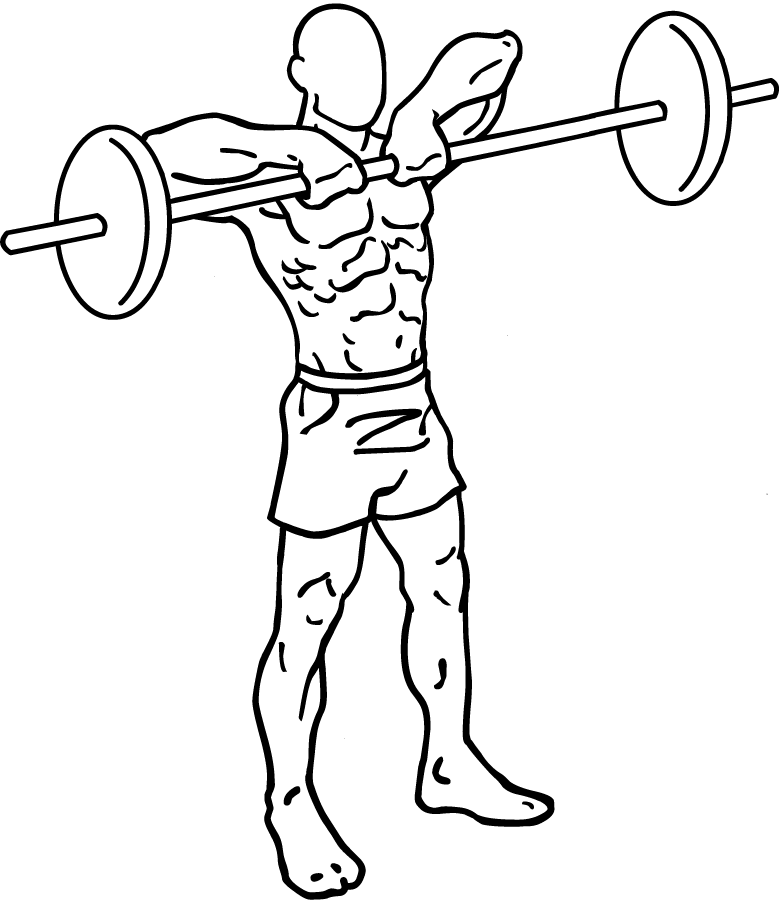
Barbell end

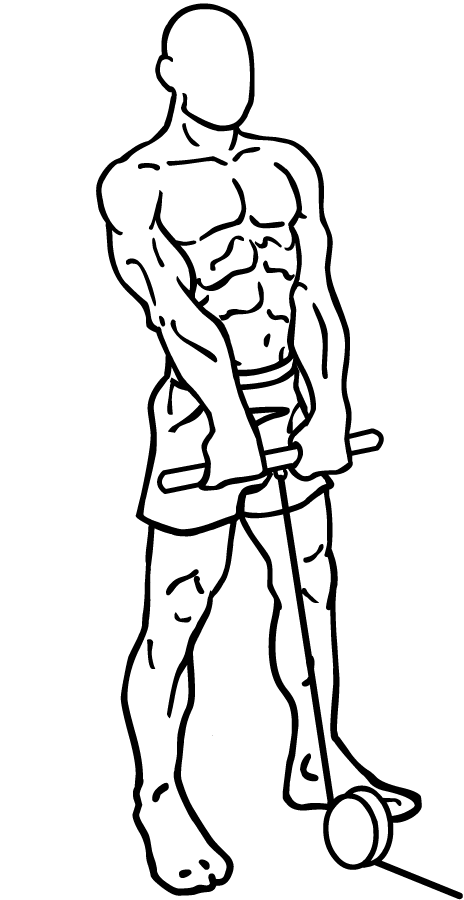
Cable start

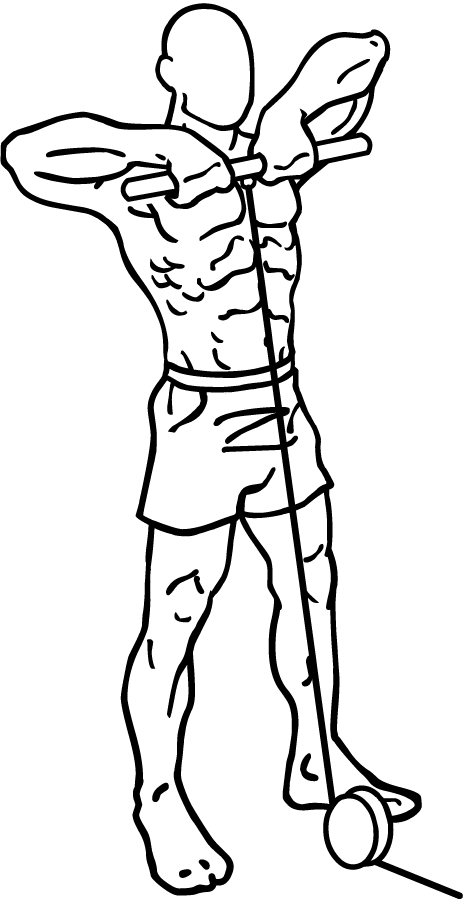
Cable end

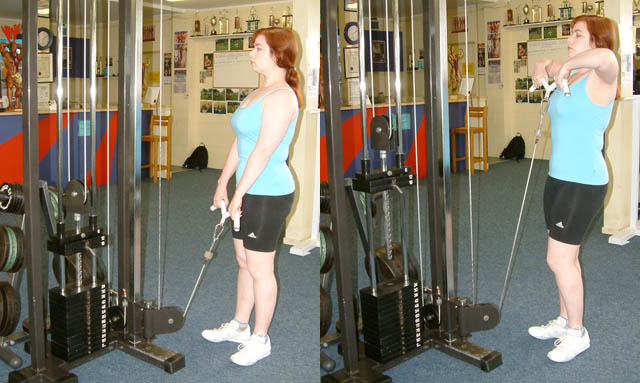
Cable movement demonstrated by live model

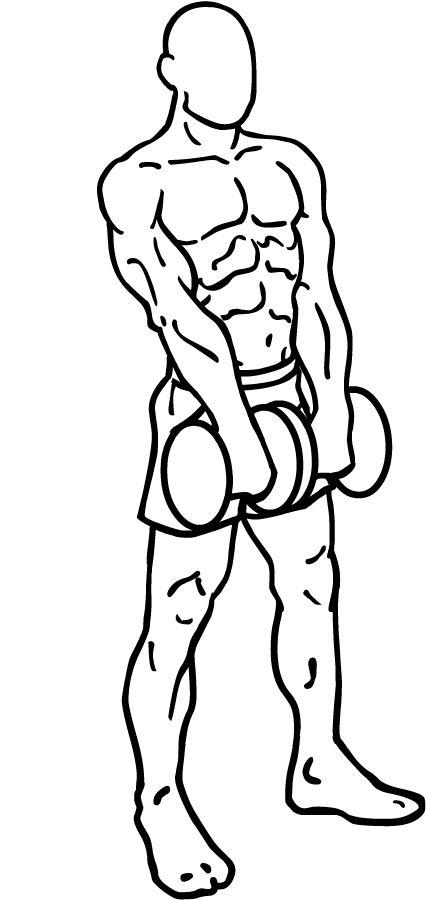
Dumbbell start

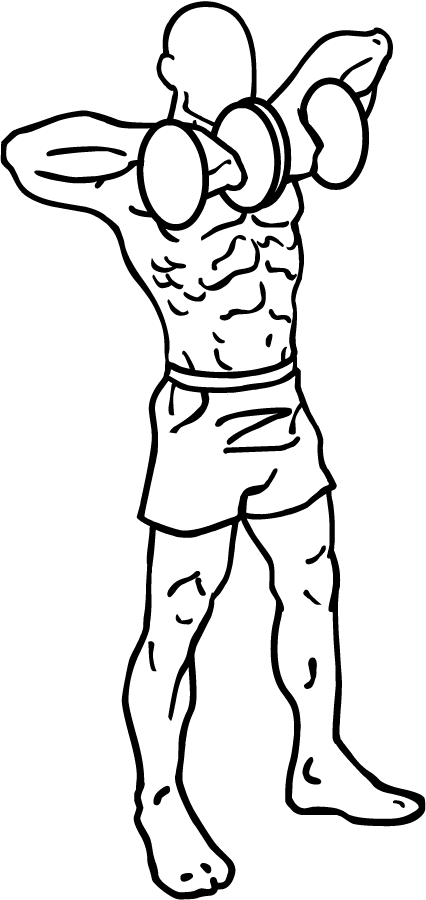
Dumbbell end

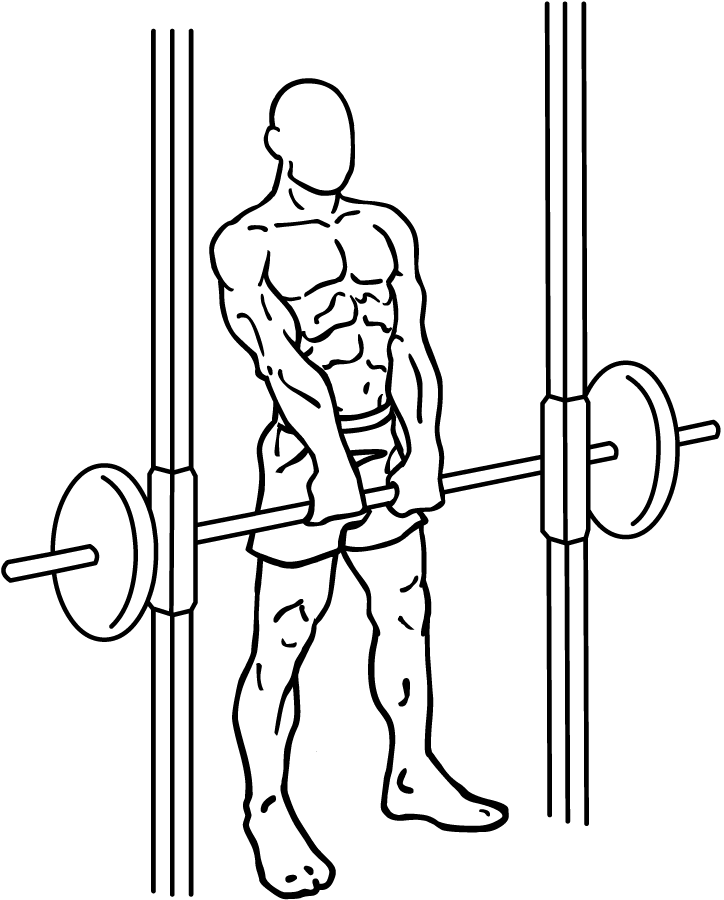
Smith machine start

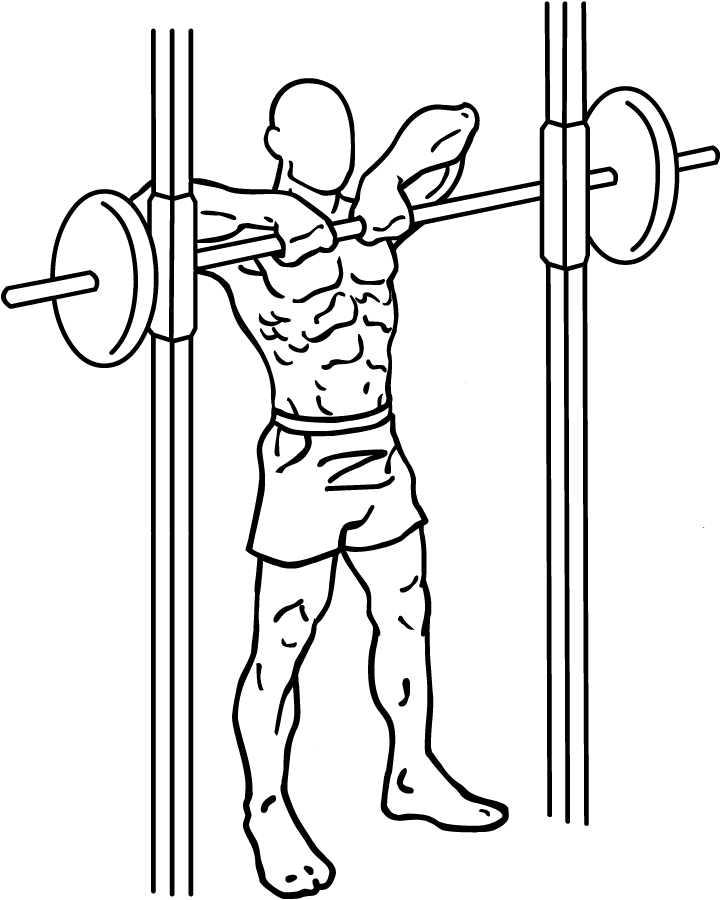
Smith machine end

== Contraindication ==
Due to the amount of internal rotation of the humerus during this movement, many trainers and organizations (such as the ACSM and NFPT) consider this a contraindicated exercise for all trainees. Most will at least advise those with shoulder impingement issues to avoid it. Abstaining from raising the bar above the chest line will help in avoiding injury or symptoms related to rotator cuff impingement. If pain arises, stop this exercise immediately, as it may be an indicator of a rotator cuff disorder. Substitutes include high pulls and shoulder shrugs for upper trapezius development and lateral raises for lateral deltoids.
