= Robyn Landis =

American author, public speaker and folk singer

Robyn Landis is an American author, public speaker and folk singer who was born in Brooklyn, New York, and has lived in Seattle, Washington, and Tucson, Arizona, United States. At age 25 she wrote a book called Bodyfueling which was published by Warner Books and became a surprise bestseller. "Bodyfueling" is a term she coined and has used to promote her philosophy of increased health through knowing the important details about how the body works and the important interactions between nutrition and exercise. Bodyfueling is an approach to health and fitness that emphasizes a thorough understanding of how the human body uses food and reacts to exercise. It places a heavy emphasis on breaking away from "diet thinking" and encourages people to concentrate instead on knowledgeably caring for the body, eating for performance, eating in accordance with your levels of physical activity and eating enough to fuel the body adequately. Simply stated, Bodyfueling advocates "eat more, exercise more" as a key to fitness rather than "eat less, exercise more", which Landis indicates is an unexamined platitude.

From 1989 to 1999 she studied traditional herbal medicine with Karta Purkh Singh Khalsa. This led her to co-author a second book called Herbal Defense in 1997 with Khalsa, also published by Warner Books.

As a journalist Landis has written on a range of topics, principally: health and fitness, ecologically conscious shopping, green living, sustainability, natural remedies and eco-political activism.

Also a songwriter and musician, she began performing professionally in 2005. Her gifts and skills as a writer, applied to songcraft, earned her quick recognition. Since 2005 she has accrued over 55 songwriting awards and honors. She and co-writer Larry Murante won the Grand Prize, Folk category /Session 1, in the John Lennon Songwriting Contest (2009). Landis also won first place at Woody Guthrie Folk Festival (2006), second place in the Unisong International Songwriting Competition (2006), a Telluride Troubadors honorable mention (2008), and was a Falcon Ridge Folk Festival Emerging Artist (2009). In 2012 she won the Wildflower! Festival Songwriting Contest judged by Beth Nielsen Chapman. Her 2009 CD Many Moons was one of the most-played records on folk radio in 2009 (with no promotional support) and her 2014 CD Waterproof (released July 2014) was produced by the late John Jennings, the producer/guitarist who produced eight Mary-Chapin Carpenter records.

Robyn toured nationally and taught songwriting at festivals until 2011 when she turned her focus back to her first passion of health coaching and writing, helping people happily embrace healthy living without drudgery. Since then she has coached hundreds of individuals and taught online courses, using her depth-based, spiritually informed process developed over decades. Her approach evolved far beyond "diet and exercise" to embrace a concept of "whole life nourishment" that cultivates joyful, easeful, naturally healthy choices. She now calls her approach "Self-Care As a Sacred Practice" as well as "Nourished" and is working on her third book entitled Nourished. She is also earning master's degree in Counseling with a somatic emphasis and is focused on positive, healthy "super-aging"—in mind, body, and spirit—that defies society's notions of what it means to be older.
