= Bone exercise monitor =

Physiological instrument

A bone exercise monitor is an instrument which is used to measure and analyze the bone strengthening qualities of physical activity and to help in prevention of osteoporosis with physical activity and exercise.

The bone strengthening quality of physical exercise is very difficult to assess and monitor due to the great variability of intensity of exercise modes and individual differences in exercise patterns. Bone exercise monitors utilize accelerometers for measurement, and the collected data is analyzed with a specially developed algorithm.

The bone is stimulated by the acceleration and deceleration forces also known as G-forces causing impacts on the body, stimulating bone growth by adding new bone and by improving its architectural strength.

The Bone Exercise Monitor is worn on the hip during the daily chores or during exercise. The monitor measures the accelerations and deceleration of the body and analyzes the results. The daily (and weekly) achieved bone exercise is shown on the monitor's display.

== Bibliography ==
- Aki Vainionpää, Raija Korpelainen, Juhani Leppäluoto and Timo Jämsä. (2005) "Effects of high-impact exercise on bone mineral density: a randomized controlled trial in premenopausal women". Osteoporosis International. Volume 16, Number 2. pp. 191–97.
- A. Vainionpää, R. Korpelainen, E. Vihriälä, A. Rinta–Paavola, J. Leppäluoto and T. Jämsä (2006) "Intensity of exercise is associated with bone density change in premenopausal women". Osteoporosis International. Volume 17, Number 3, pp. 455–63.
- Timo Jämsä, Aki Vainionpää, Raija Korpelainen, Erkki Vihriälä and Juhani Leppäluoto (2006) "Effect of daily physical activity on proximal femur". Clinical Biomechanics. Volume 21, Issue 1, pp. 1–7.
