= Russian twist =

Abdominal exercise movement

The Russian twist is a simple abdominal exercise for working the core, shoulders, and hips. It is typically performed in repetitive sets and tones the core muscles via a twisting motion focused around the abdomen. The exercise can help build strength in the upper torso, which may help in sports such as tennis, , baseball and football, track & field, hockey, golf, lacrosse, or boxing. There are also many variations of the Russian twist that can be used to intensify a workout routine.

== Technique ==
To perform the Russian Twist, one sits on the floor and bends both knees while their feet are kept together and held slightly above the ground (or put under a stable surface). Ideally, the torso is kept straight with the back kept off the ground at a 45-degree angle with arms held together away from the body in a straight fashion and hands kept locked together like a ball or one can hold a weight to increase the difficulty. Next, the arms should be swung from one side to another in a twisting motion, with each swing to a side counting as one repetition. The slower one moves the arms from side to side, the harder the exercise becomes, working the abdomen that much better. When moving one's arms during the exercise, it is crucial to not stop between repetitions or else one will lose the effect of working the abdomen. As with all exercise, consistent breathing in and out during the exercise is important as one must ensure proper oxygen flow.

There are also other variants of this exercise such as using a stability ball or with a barbell standing up.

=== Mason Twist ===
The Mason Twist is a more advanced version of the Russian Twist. It is performed in the same manner, except the legs are straight and the feet are held off the ground (in the V-sit position) for the duration of the exercise.
