= Leg extension =

Resistance weight training exercise

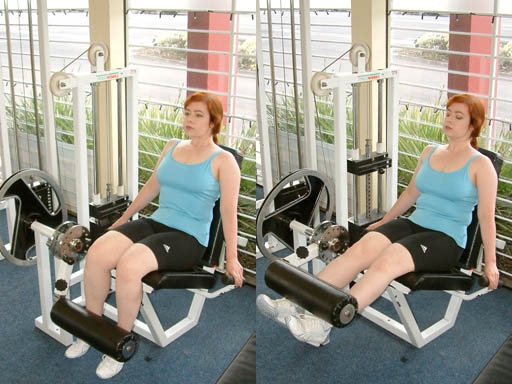
Leg extension

The leg extension is a resistance weight training exercise that targets the quadriceps muscle (m. quadriceps femoris) in the legs. The exercise is done using a machine called the Leg Extension Machine. There are various manufacturers of these machines and each one is slightly different. The leg extension is an isolated exercise targeting one specific muscle group, the quadriceps.

== History ==
The leg extension machine was created by American fitness guru Jack LaLanne in the 1950s. The first prototype is recognized to have been made under Gustav Zander, but labeled the machine as a form of “mechanotherapy” along with other machines that extended the knee and ankle. The machine was made to target the quadriceps. The exact method of inventing the leg extension machine is not consistently recorded, but in most cases, it is attributed to LaLanne.

== Modern machine variants ==
In 2025, a standing leg-extension machine variant was introduced by British equipment designer Matt Bembridge (also known as "Gym Professor"). The design places the user in an upright standing posture while performing knee extension against resistance, differing from the conventional seated leg-extension machine. The machine is registered under UK Registered Design No. 6451375 and is the subject of UK patent application GB2516100.1.
