= Triceps surae muscle =

Pair of muscles: gastrocnemius and the soleus

Triceps surae
- Posterior view of the triceps surae.
- Dissection video (1 min 40 s)

Details
- Pronunciation: /ˈtraɪsɛps ˈsjʊəri/
- Origin: Distal femur (gastrocnemius), posterior tibia (soleus)
- Insertion: Achilles tendon, calcaneus
- Artery: Posterior tibial artery
- Nerve: Tibial nerve
- Actions: Plantarflexion

Identifiers
- Latin: musculus triceps surae
- TA98: A04.7.02.043
- TA2: 2656
- FMA: 51062

The triceps surae consists of two muscles located in the calf – the two-headed gastrocnemius and the soleus. These muscles both insert into the calcaneus, the bone of the heel of the human foot, and form the major part of the muscle of the posterior leg, commonly known as the calf muscle.

== Structure ==
The triceps surae is connected to the foot through the Achilles tendon, and has three heads deriving from the two major masses of muscle.

- The superficial portion (the gastrocnemius) gives off two heads attaching to the base of the femur directly above the knee.
- The deep (profundus) mass of muscle (the soleus) forms the remaining head which attaches to the superior posterior area of the tibia.

The triceps surae is innervated by the tibial nerve, specifically, nerve roots L5–S2.

== Function ==
Contraction of the triceps surae induce plantar flexion (sagittal plane) and stabilization of the ankle complex in the transverse plane. Functional activities include primarily movement in the sagittal plane, stabilization during locomotion (walking, running), restraining the body from falling and power jumping. By controlling the disequilibrium torque, the triceps surae can affect force through the exchange of potential into kinetic energy.

== Clinical significance ==
=== Calf strain (torn calf muscle) ===
A calf strain refers to damage to a muscle or its attaching tendons. A premature return before recovery is achieved will result in a prolonged recovery or incomplete return to baseline prior to injury. Stretches such as alternating calf raises can improve flexibility as well as mobilize legs before running.

Calf muscles are a common place for fasciculations.

== Additional images ==
Animation. Gastrocnemius and soleus are shown in different colors.

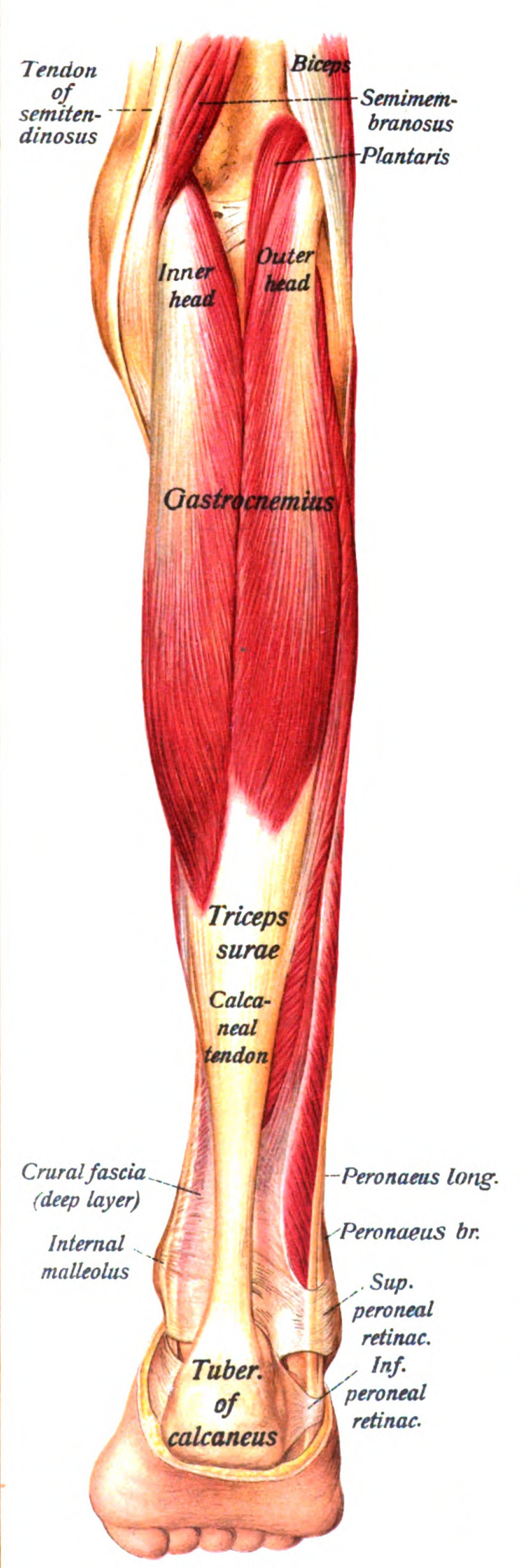
Illustration of the gastrocnemius.

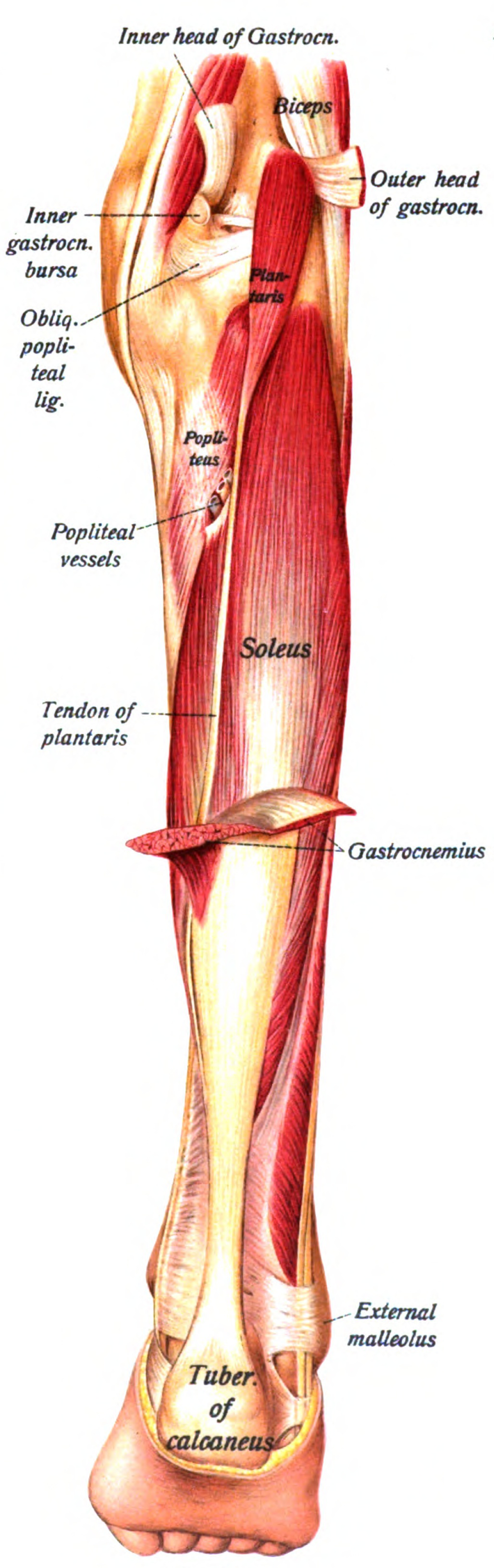
Illustration of soleus.

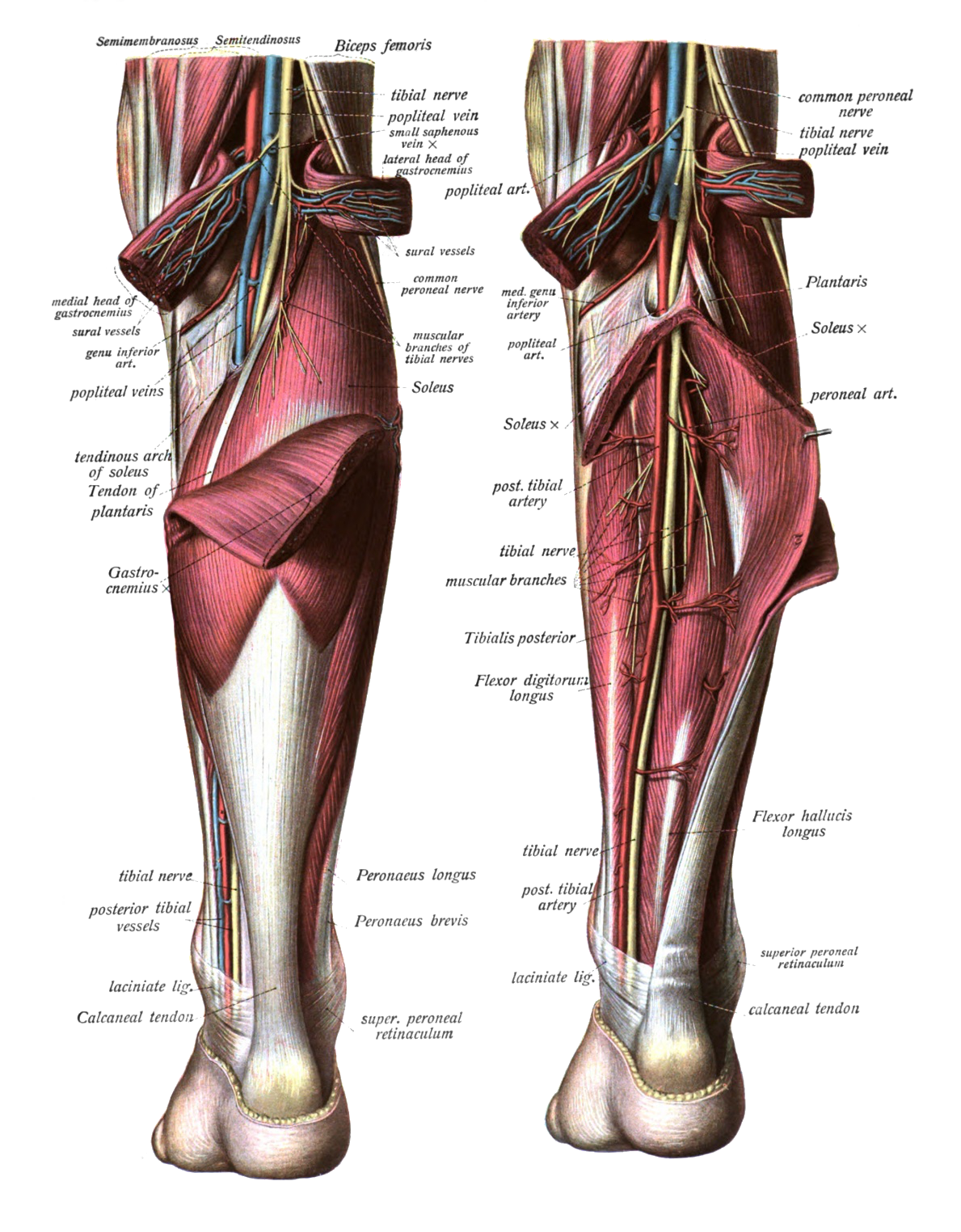
Nerves, arteries and veins surround the gastrocnemius and soleus.

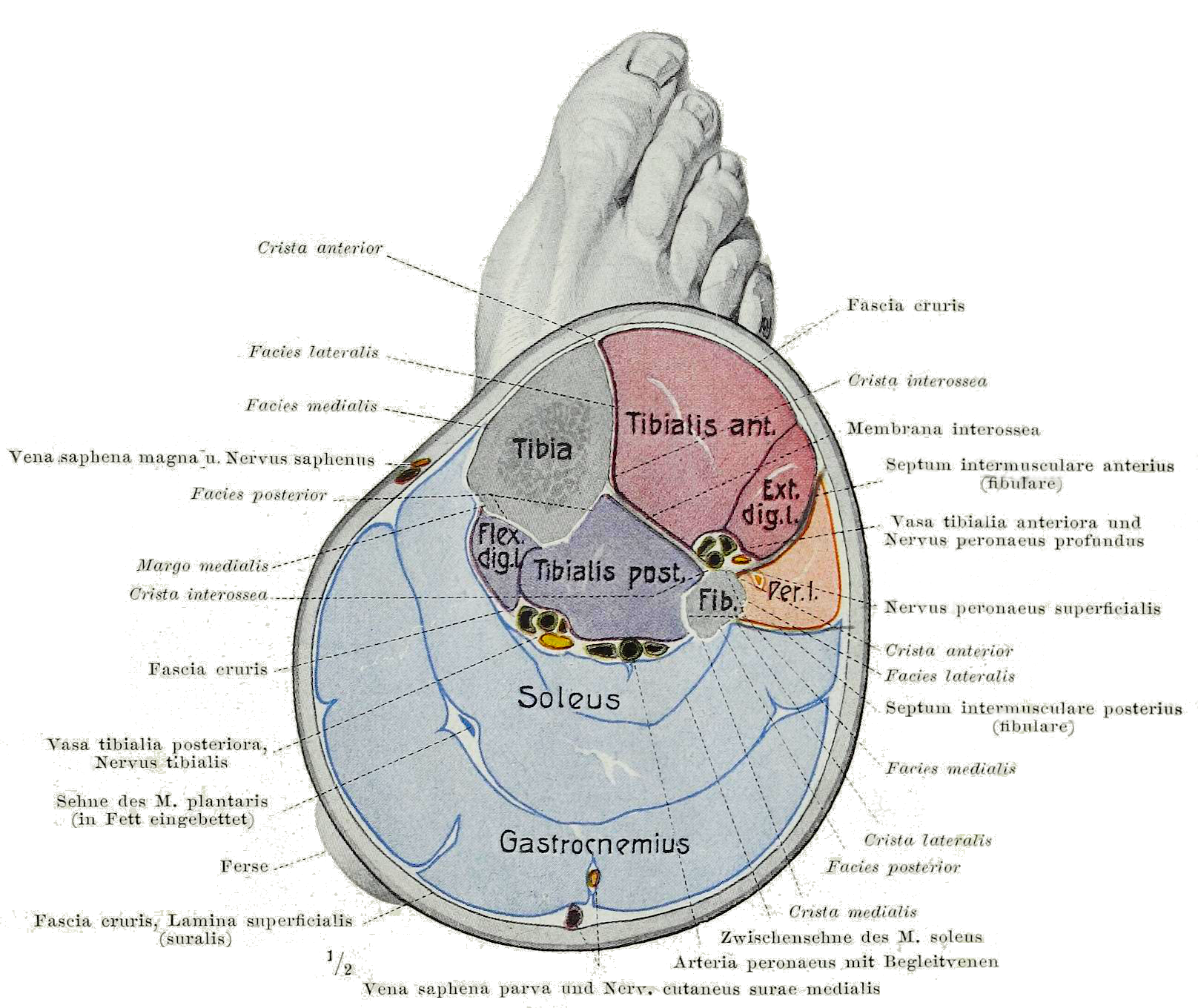
Cross section of the lower leg, with triceps surae at back (soleus and gastrocnemius)

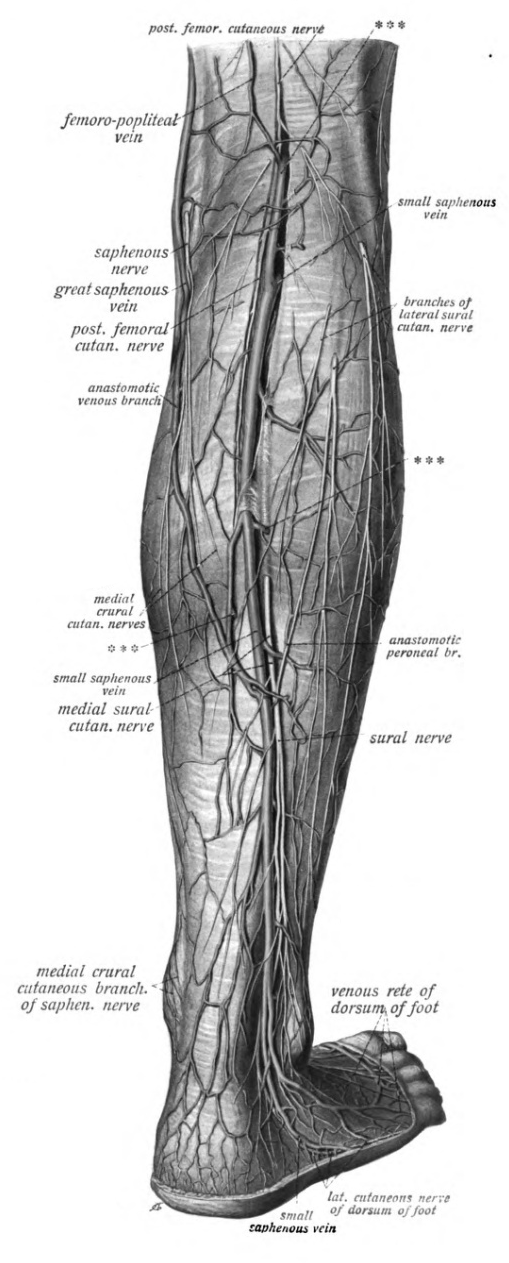
Nerves and blood-vessels overlying the triceps surae

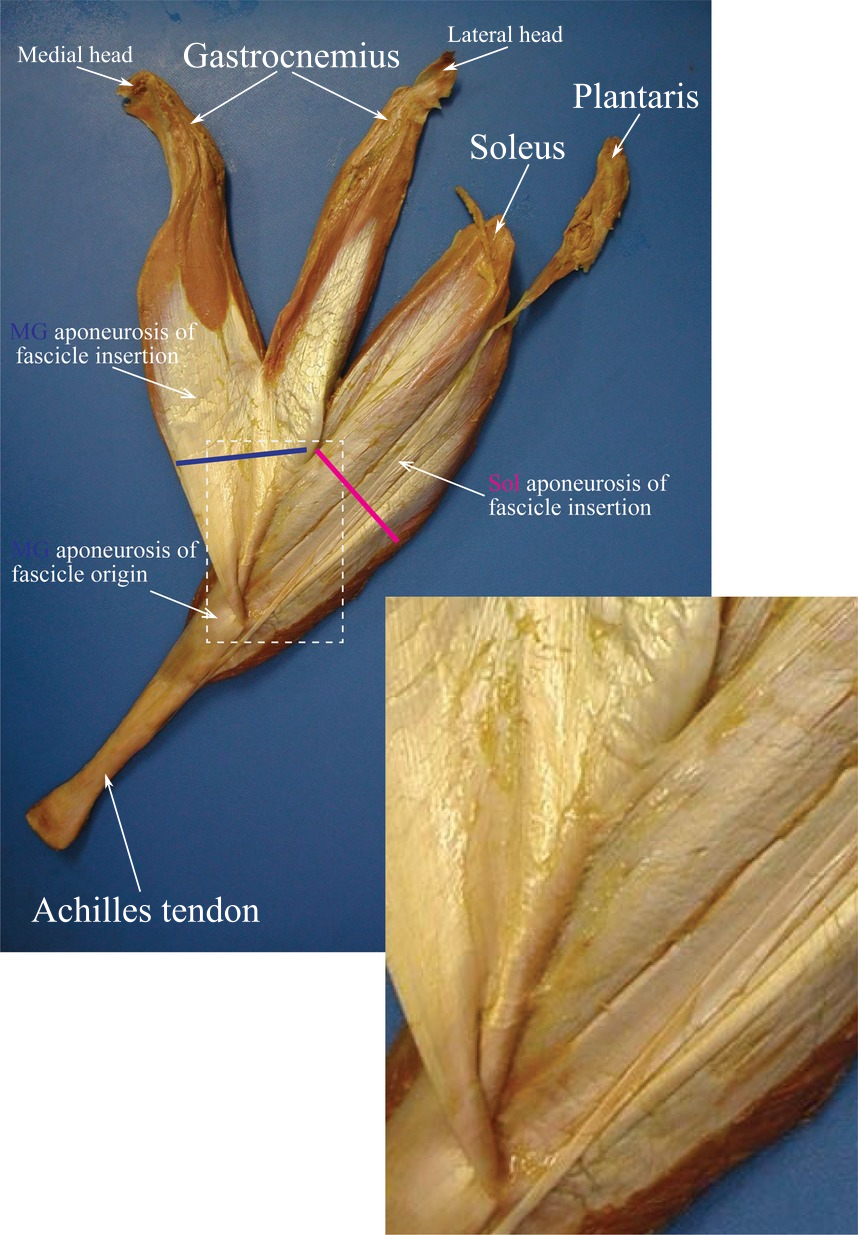
Photograph of the gastrocnemius-soleus junction.

== Etymology and pronunciation ==
The term is pronounced /ˈtraɪsɛps ˈsjʊəri/. It is from Latin caput and sura meaning "three-headed [muscle] of the calf".
