= Good-morning (exercise) =

Weight training exercise

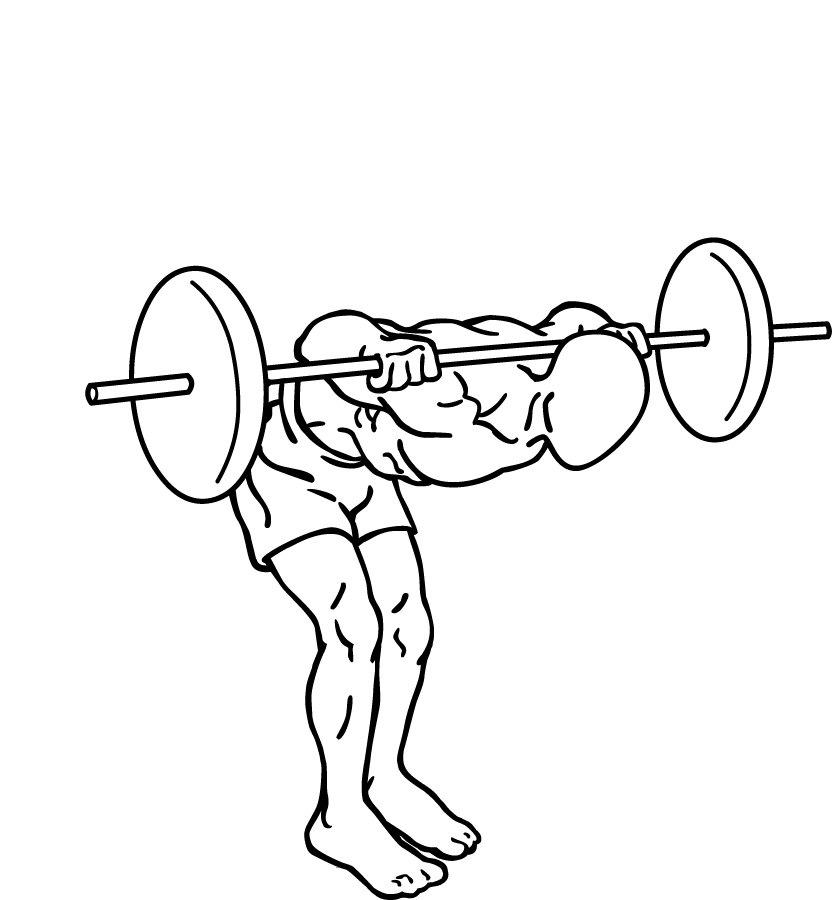
Good morning exercise starting position

The good-morning is a weight training exercise. It is known as a good-morning because of the movement in the erector spinae which resembles the bow that traditionally begins a schoolday in some East Asian countries. The erector spinae muscles of the lower back work isometrically to keep the spine in an extended position while the hamstrings and gluteus maximus work isotonically to perform hip extension. Other muscles are involved in stabilizing weight on the back and maintaining balance.

The degree of knee bend used will change the focus. The straighter the knees, the more the hamstrings are stretched and stressed by the movement and this stretch involves them more as the hip extensors. Bent knees can shift the weight forward, which allows the pelvis to drift back further as the body hinges in hip flexion.

== Importance ==
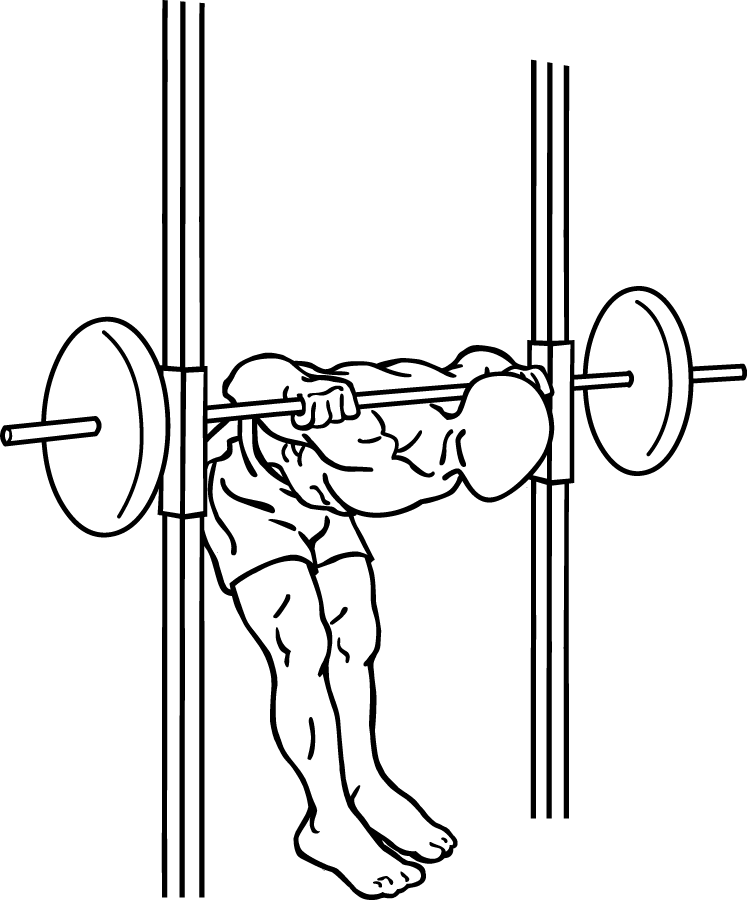
Good morning exercise using Smith machine.

The good-morning is an essential exercise in the Westside Barbell method and is often trained to near limit maxima. Developing strength in the lift aids in the recovery of a "bad" squat, reducing the risk of injury. Properly applied, it can also strengthen an individual's deadlift; for this reason, it is a key exercise in the conjugate method of training this lift.

In Olympic weightlifting, the good-morning is used as the most efficient assistance exercise to train the second phase of the clean or snatch pull and bases of squat positions in snatch drops and clean squat positions. In this variation, the lifter will descend, reverse direction, and accelerate the ascent, rising up onto the toes at the conclusion of the lift. This mimics the rapid hip extension and subsequent toe-rise during the clean and jerk or snatch.

== Form ==
One starts with a barbell held on one's shoulders, behind the head. Similar to a back squat, there is some variation with the height on the back at which the bar is held. Holding the bar lower on the back decreases the distance to the pelvis and decreases the strain on the hip and spine extensors: a low bar position allows one to lift heavier weights while a high position allows one to stress the muscles harder with a lighter weight.

Another possibility is to hold a barbell at the crooks of the arms, on the inside of the elbow, as in a Zercher squat .

The lifter bends forward, bowing at the hips while keeping the back straight. This is the eccentric portion. The motion is at its halfway point when the lifter's torso is almost parallel with the ground, after which the lifter returns to the upright position, during the concentric portion.

It is recommended that the lifter avoid rounding (flexing) or rotation (twisting) at any point during movement; however, it appears that some spinal flexion is elicited during the movement. A properly distributed bar, balance and core stability help to prevent this from occurring in excess. The lifter should rather concentrate on pushing the hips back while keeping the spine straight or arched.

== Implements ==
Other forms of resistance can be used other than a barbell in variations of the movement. While awkward and creating pressure points, dumbbells or kettlebells may be used. A sandbag is a comfortable alternative, or a medicine ball held behind the head. Weighted clubs or maces can be set against the back. Stretch bands anchored under the feet are also used.

The movement can also be performed with an empty bar, a broomstick, or one's body weight, a variation suitable for beginners, casual stretching, warmups, warmdowns or endurance training.

A similar exercise and easier alternative for odd implements such as dumbbells would be doing stiff or straight legged deadlifts. This involves the arms hanging down rather than up at one's back, and the pressure is exerted on the back through being held in the hands and through one's supporting back musculature such as the lattismus dorsi, trapezius and rhomboids.

== Dangers ==
The good-morning is a controversial exercise as some will claim that it leads to lower back injuries. Famously, Bruce Lee seriously injured himself while performing the exercise after an inadequate warm-up and over confidently selecting his working weight. On the other hand, the good-morning can also strengthen the lower back and prevent injury when properly applied.

Rounding the back can result in back injuries. To aid in preventing a rounded back, the lifter's chin should remain upright. A common technique is to focus the eyes on a spot at about belt height during the lift, reversing direction after lowering when the eyes come in line with the spot. At the bottom of the range of motion, this keeps the chin up and the head tilted back, facilitating a flat or slightly arched spine.
