= Smith machine =

Weight training machine

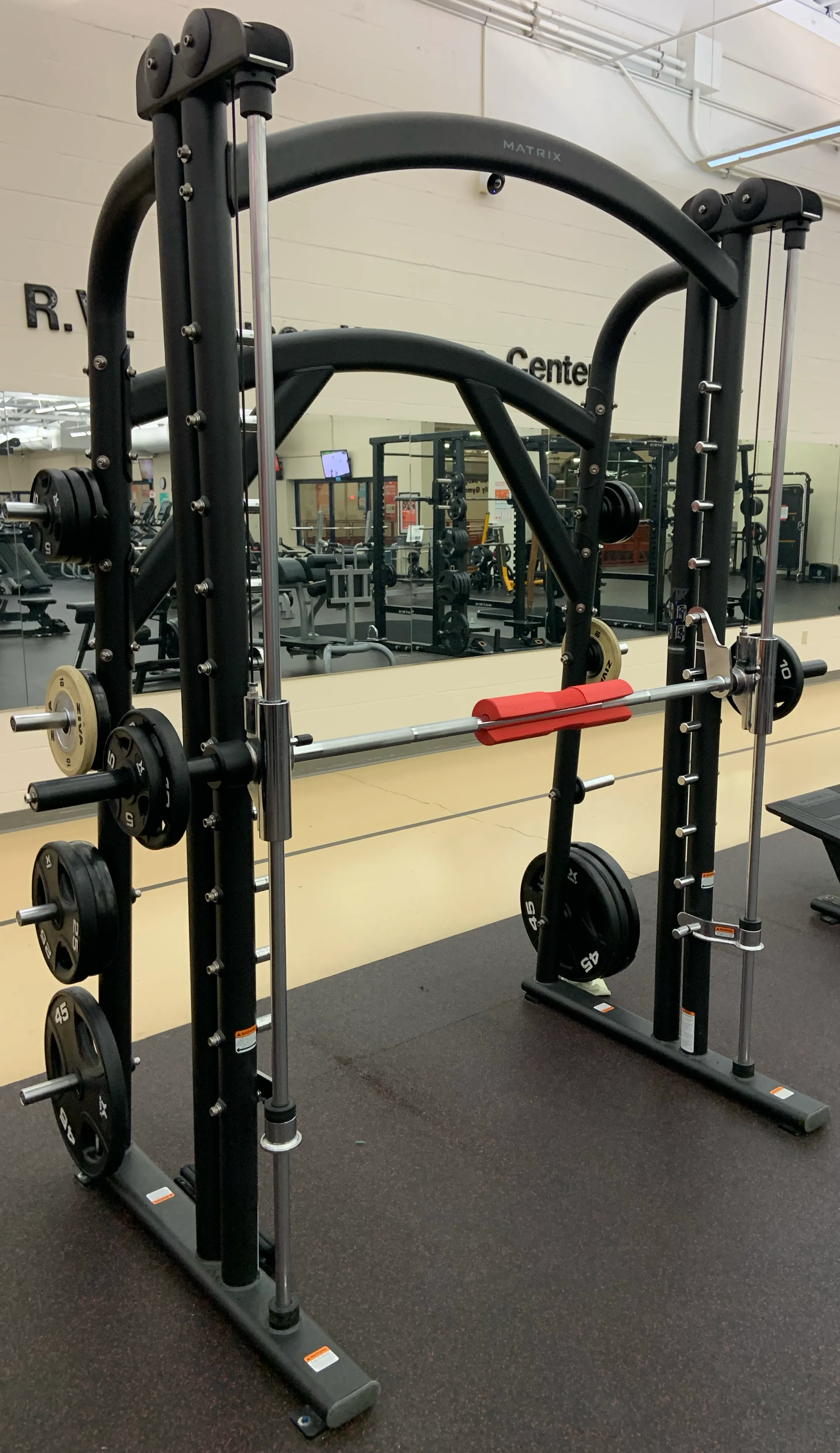
Smith machine

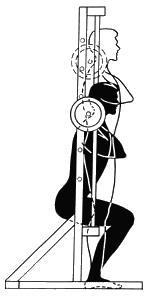
A Smith machine can be used for a variation of a squat.

The Smith machine is a weight machine used for weight training. It consists of a barbell that is fixed within steel rails allowing for only strict vertical movement. Some Smith machines have the barbell counterbalanced. The machine can be used for a wide variety of exercises including but not exclusive to squats, the bench press, the shoulder press, good mornings and deadlifts.

== Use as a self-spotting device ==
Behind each vertical post (runner) is a series of slots on which the barbell can be hooked. This means that unlike an ordinary barbell, the Smith machine need not be re-racked after a set of repetitions: it can be secured at any point. This is intended to make it safer for those who lift without a spotter, as one only needs to twist the wrist in order to lock the barbell in place in the event that the weight becomes too great. Most models also incorporate blocks, pegs, or other devices which can be adjusted to automatically stop the barbell at a predetermined minimum height.

This does not fully eliminate the inherent danger in having a heavy weight on one's back, however, and may instill a false sense of confidence. In 2001, a Smith machine user became quadriplegic when the apparatus crushed his spine. Bench pressing while alone is dangerous in general, but even more so in a Smith machine; if one gets trapped under the bar, it cannot be rolled or tipped sideways off one's chest or neck, which has led to at least one fatality.

== Advantages and disadvantages ==
Use of the Smith machine is frowned upon by many strength training devotees as it forces the user to adopt an unnatural straight-up-and-down "bar path". This unnatural movement can cause shear stress on the knees and/or back when squatting or shoulders (if pressing).

The constrained movement of the bar also reduces the role that stabilizing muscles play versus an exercise using free weights. This may allow heavier weights to be lifted, at the expense of engaging less muscle mass overall. It is also hard to keep an accurate training log because manufacturers do not usually indicate bar weights.

As with other exercise machines, the Smith machine is often preferred by casual or inexperienced strength trainees who do not know how to safely perform free weight exercises involving heavy weights.

The Smith machine does have some advocates amongst experienced trainees, however. The "bar path" issue is minimized for exercises involving a short range of travel such as calf raises and shrugs. It is potentially good for performing exercise variations when progress has slowed using other exercise forms, although care must be taken to avoid joint stress issues. The removal of stabilizing muscles as a factor can also allow one to increase the intensity applied to primary muscles.

== 3D Smith machine ==
A conventional Smith machine has one degree of freedom – the bar can move up and down in a straight line along a vertical track. (Rolling the bar is also typically used to activate the safety locks.) Some variant designs allow an additional degree of freedom – forward and back – while still keeping the bar from rotating or moving side to side. These machines are sometimes called "3D Smith machines" or "Jones Smith machines".

== Origin and history ==
The Smith machine was invented by American Jack LaLanne, who rigged up a sliding apparatus in his gym in the 1950s. It was spotted by Rudy Smith, who commissioned Paul Martin to improve it. Smith then installed the modified model in a gym he was managing at the time, Vic Tanny's gym in Los Angeles. By the end of the 1950s, Rudy Smith was an executive in Tanny's chain of gyms, and the Smith machine was being manufactured and sold more widely.
