= Leg press =

Weight training exercise

Cable leg press machine

The leg press is a compound weight training exercise in which the individual pushes a weight or resistance away from them using their legs. The term leg press machine refers to the apparatus used to perform this exercise. The leg press can be used to evaluate an athlete's overall lower body strength (from the gluteus Maximus to the lower leg muscles). It can help to build squat strength. If performed correctly, the inclined leg press can help build knees that can handle heavier free weights, on the other hand, it also carries a risk of serious damage since locked knees can bend the wrong direction throughout the exercise.

It can be performed in variations, for example with one leg, or attaching bands to the leg press.

== Types ==
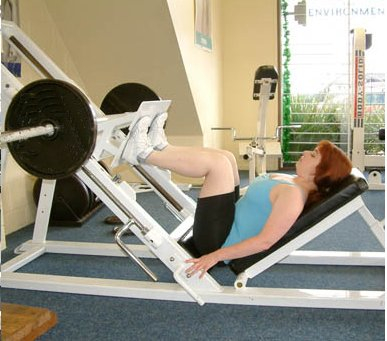
Incline leg press

There are two main types of leg press:

- The diagonal (incline) or vertical 'sled' type leg press. Weight plates are directly attached to a sled, which is mounted on rails. The user sits below the sled and pushes it upward with their feet. These machines normally include adjustable safety brackets that prevent the user from being trapped under the weight.
- The 'cable' type leg press, or 'seated leg press'. The user sits upright and pushes forward with their feet onto a plate. The plate is connected to the weight stack by a long steel cable.

== Muscle groups ==
The leg press works the following muscle groups:

- Quadriceps
- Hamstring
- Gluteus maximus
- Calves (partially)

Varying the angle between the sled and the backrest and/or the position of the feet on the plate puts more emphasis on one or the other muscle group.

== Variations ==
=== One-legged ===
The leg press can be performed with one leg only. This can help to build stabilizing muscles. It is sometimes considered to be a more 'functional' exercise than the two-legged bilateral leg press because it can better replicate sporting or athletic movements where one leg is primarily being employed. According to the NFL quarterback Colin Kaepernick, 'I like single-leg work because it isn't often as a quarterback that both of your feet are stationary and planted.' Performing the exercise one-legged may also help to correct strength imbalances between the legs. This is because during a bilateral two-legged leg press one side may be excessively dominant. Working both legs alternatively in a single-legged fashion means each leg has to perform the same amount of work.

=== Standing ===
A standing leg press is a one-legged variation which is performed with one foot on the floor and the other positioned ahead of the person on a wall. Keeping one foot on the floor, the person bends their leg and moves towards the wall, and then straightens their leg and moves away from the wall etc. Alternatively an unfixed sled or cable pulley machine can be used to provide resistance against which the person pushes against.

== See also ==
- Exercise
- Exercise physiology
