= Push-down (exercise) =

Exercise for triceps muscles

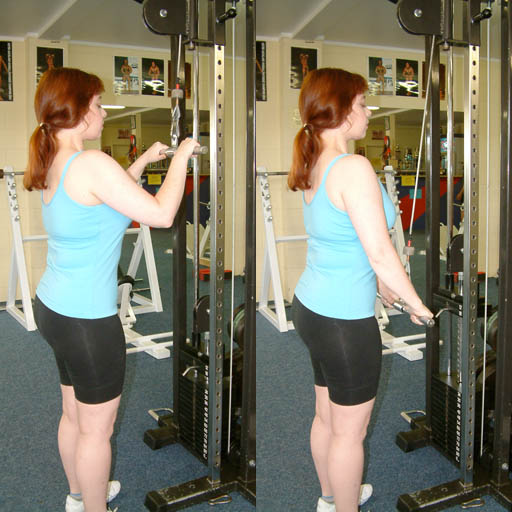
Figure 1: Push-down on a cable machine

A push-down is a strength training exercise used for strengthening the triceps muscles in the back of the arm. This exercise can also be called a triceps push-down or a two-armed standing triceps extension.

The exercise is completed by pushing an object downward against resistance. This exercise is an example of the primary function of the triceps, the extension of the elbow joint.

There are multiple variations to the push-down that will target the triceps muscle in different ways.

Rope push-down is a variation that involves connecting a rope attachment to a cable machine. While executing a rope push-down, the palms face in and the arms internally rotate while pushing down. This variation works all three parts of the triceps, but especially the lateral head (coloured yellow Figure 2).

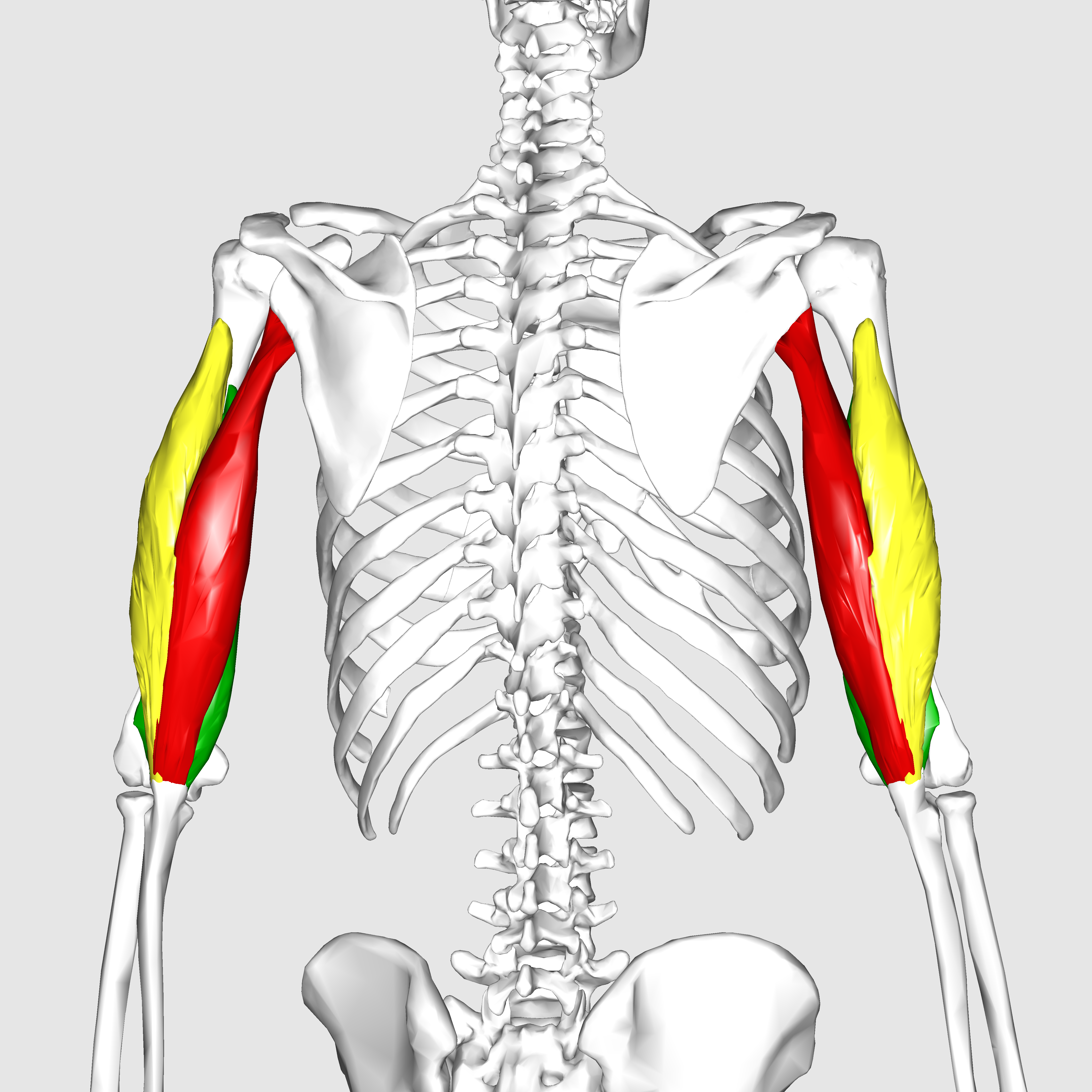
Figure 2: The triceps muscle, showing the lateral head (yellow), the long head (red) and the medial head (green).

Straight bar push-down is a variation that involves connecting a straight bar attachment to a cable machine. In executing this variation, the bar is gripped with the knuckles facing up and the elbows are held close to the body. This variation targets the long head of the triceps (coloured red in Figure 2).

V-bar push-down is a combination of a rope push-down and a straight bar push-down. This variation uses a V-bar attachment connected to a cable machine and is executed with the elbows held close to the body.. This variation targets all three heads of the triceps.

Push-downs can also be executed with resistance bands, alternating single-armed, and with varying grips.
