= Pull-down (exercise) =

Strength training exercise

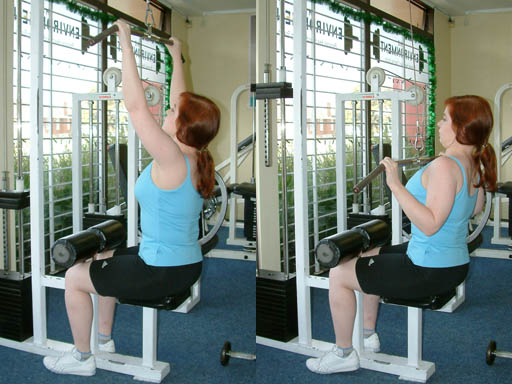
Cable pull-down exercise to the front with a medium-width overhand (pronated) grip

The pull-down exercise is a strength training exercise designed to develop the latissimus dorsi muscle. It performs the functions of downward rotation and depression of the scapulae combined with adduction and extension of the shoulder joint.

The cable lat pull-down is done where the handle is moved via a cable pulley, as opposed to doing pull-downs on a leverage machine.

== Muscles ==
The standard pull-down motion is a compound movement that requires dynamic work by muscles surrounding the three joints which move during the exercise. These are the elbow in conjunction with the glenohumeral and scapulothoracic joints in the shoulder girdle.

=== Latissimus dorsi ===
The latissimus dorsi performs extension and adduction of the arm directly to the spinal fascia. It bypasses the scapulae unlike other muscles which perform this function, so work performed by this muscle will not contribute to muscles that affect the scapulae. The lower sternal fibers of the pectoralis major also perform this role of extension and adduction to a lesser degree.

The contraction of these adductor/extensor muscles can indirectly depress and downwardly rotate the scapulae; this is only required when they are pulled into elevation and upward rotation by the contraction of muscles that attach to the scapulae. If the weight were being pulled solely by the lats, for example, the scapulae would simply be pulled down by gravity, along for the ride.

=== Scapular ===
Muscles that attach to and depress the scapulae include the lower trapezius muscle and the pectoralis minor. The pec minor also works in conjunction with the rhomboid muscle and levator scapulae to perform downward rotation of the scapulae.

Muscles which attach to the scapulae that adduct and extend the arm include the posterior deltoid muscles, the teres major, and minor stabilizing contribution from some rotator cuff muscles (infraspinatus and teres minor as lateral rotators, subscapularis as medial rotators).

=== Elbow ===
Muscles which flex the elbow joint such as the biceps brachii muscle, brachialis muscles and brachioradialis muscle are active to improve leverage. As the biceps originate on the scapula unlike the other two which originate on the humerus, the biceps are inclined to serve a role as a dynamic stabilizer, much as the hamstrings would during a squat. This is because, while the biceps shortens as the elbow flexes, it will also lengthen as the shoulder extends.

A supinated grip at the forearm allows the biceps to contribute more strongly as an elbow flexor. A prone grip will rely more greatly on the other flexors, the brachialis and brachioradialis.

Using a pronated grip during pull-downs tends to result in the greatest activation of the latissimus dorsi, with no difference in latissimus dorsi activity between grip widths.

== Similarities ==
The pull-down is extremely similar to the pull-up, but uses moving external weights or resistance with a fixed body rather than a fixed bar and a moving body. This makes the pull-down an open-chain movement and the pull-up a closed-chain movement. The weight moved can also be adjusted to be more or less than the weight of the person doing the exercise.

== Form ==
Lat pulldown on a cable machine

The pull-down usually uses a weight machine with a seat and brace for the thighs. The starting position involves sitting at the machine with the thighs braced, back straight and feet flat on the floor. The arms are held overhead at full extension, grasping a bar connected to the weight stack. The movement is initiated by pulling the elbows down and back, lowering the bar to the neck, and completed by returning to the initial position.

=== Variations ===
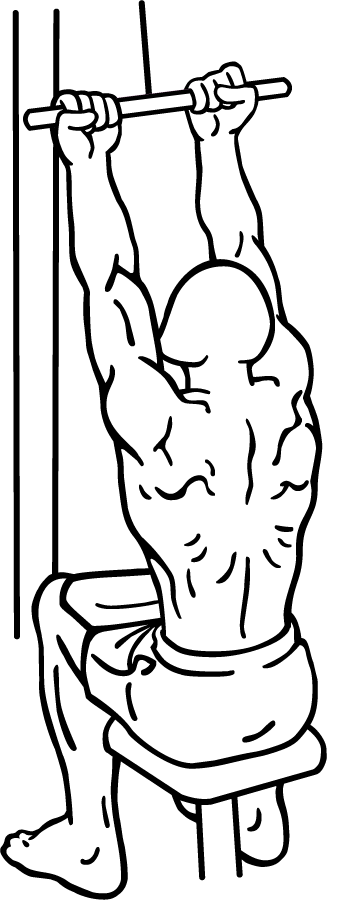
Narrow grip underhand pull-down begin

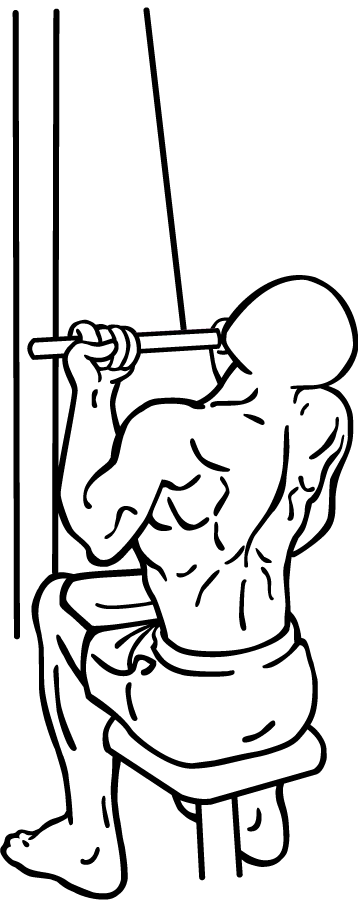
Narrow grip underhand pull-down end

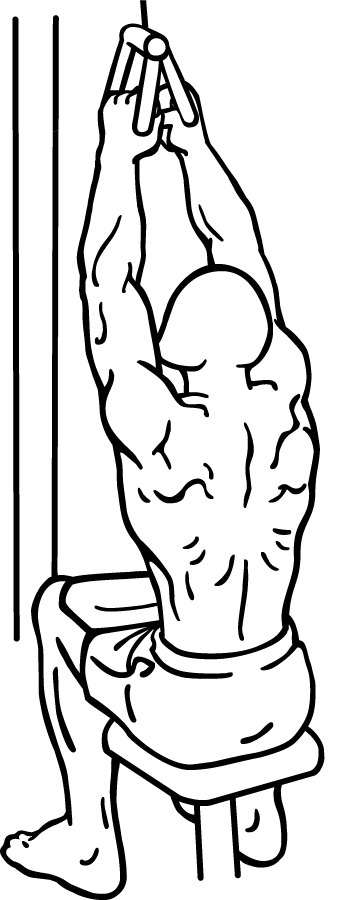
Narrow grip neutral pull-down begin

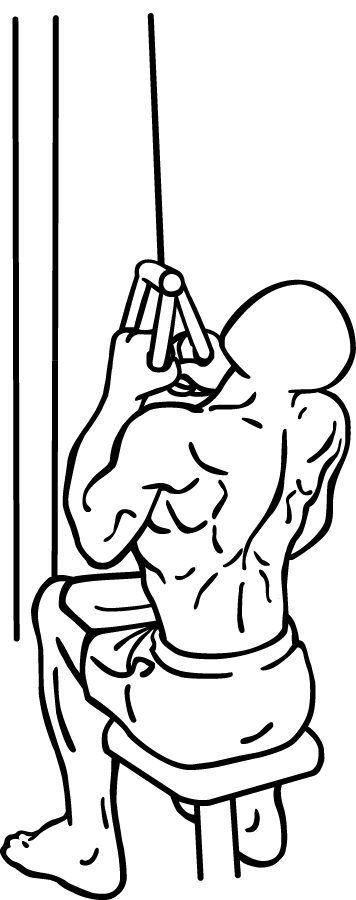
Narrow grip neutral pull-down end

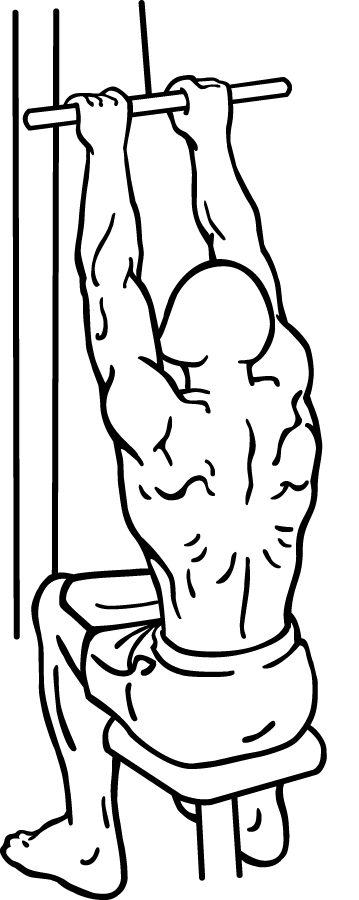
Narrow grip overhand pull-down begin

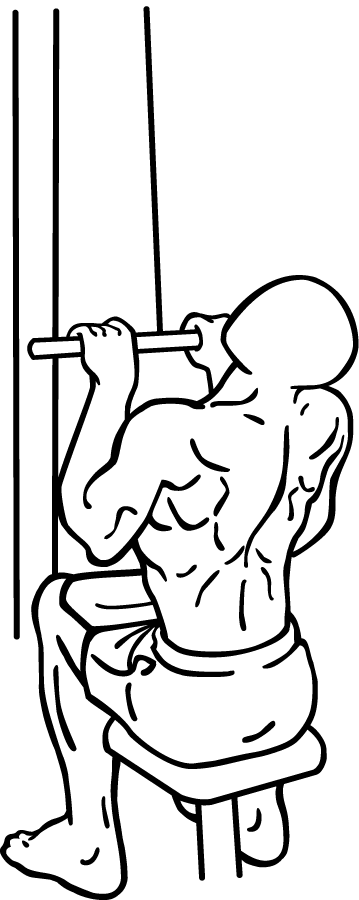
Narrow grip overhand pull-down end

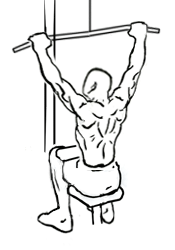
Wide grip overhand pull-down begin

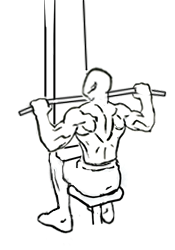
Wide grip overhand pull-down end

Variations can include touching the bar to the chest (sternum) versus the back of the neck, or varying hand spacing (wide versus narrow) or orientation (pronated versus supinated). The exercise can also be done using cable machines, a handle attached to a cable is pulled toward the body, this can be done while seated on a bench or stability ball, kneeling, or in a standing or squatting position. The number of repetitions and weight moved varies according to the specific training plan of the person training.

The chin-up/pull-up is a very similar exercise that moves the body against a fixed bar rather than moving a bar against a fixed body.

==== Behind neck ====
This variation of the lat pull-down, in which the bar is pulled behind the neck, may be dangerous and less effective. Behind the neck lat pull-downs offer no biomechanical advantages. It can cause compression of the cervical spine disks, and disk damage if contact is made by striking the bar to the neck. In addition, it can cause rotator cuff injuries.

=== Muscle involvement ===
If the weight is pulled to touch the front of the chest, the rhomboid muscles' work may increase, while pulling the weight down to touch the back of the neck may work the upper trapezius muscle.

=== Etymology ===
The "lat" sometimes added before "pull-down" commonly refers to the latissimus dorsi used in the movement.

Most exercises describe the muscle that is involved and the direction of the exercise e.g. biceps curl, triceps extension, leg press, hamstring curl, abdominal curl and so on.

Although "lat" can be first thought as short for "lateral", the term lateral means sideways and away from the body, which only describes the direction of the humerus during the eccentric portion of the movement (during which the bar is being raised, not pulled down). This means "lateral" is not an ideal term to describe the movement, it is an adjective more appropriate in usage such as lateral raise.

== See also ==
- Pull-up (exercise)
- Chin-up bar
