= Lying triceps extension =

Strength exercise

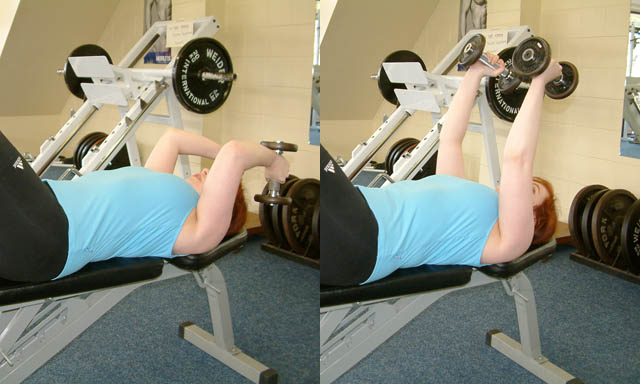
Dumbbell triceps extension

The lying triceps extension, also known as skull crusher and French extension or French press, is a strength exercise used in many different forms of strength training. It is one of the most stimulating exercises to the entire triceps muscle group in the upper arm, and works the triceps from the elbow all the way to the latissimus dorsi. Due to its full use of the triceps muscle group, the lying triceps extensions are used by many as part of their training regimen.

Triceps extensions are isolation exercises, meaning they use just one joint. They can also be beneficial for fixing imbalances in the triceps or rehabilitating from injury. In bodybuilding, this exercise is used to target the triceps for growth.

A study sponsored and done by the American Council on Exercise revealed that the extensions are around 70–90 percent effective compared to the triangle push up for the triceps. However, extensions put no pressure on the wrists so they are an alternative for people with wrist strain or injury. Despite the name, skull crushers are a safe, manageable way to effectively work the triceps.

== Execution ==
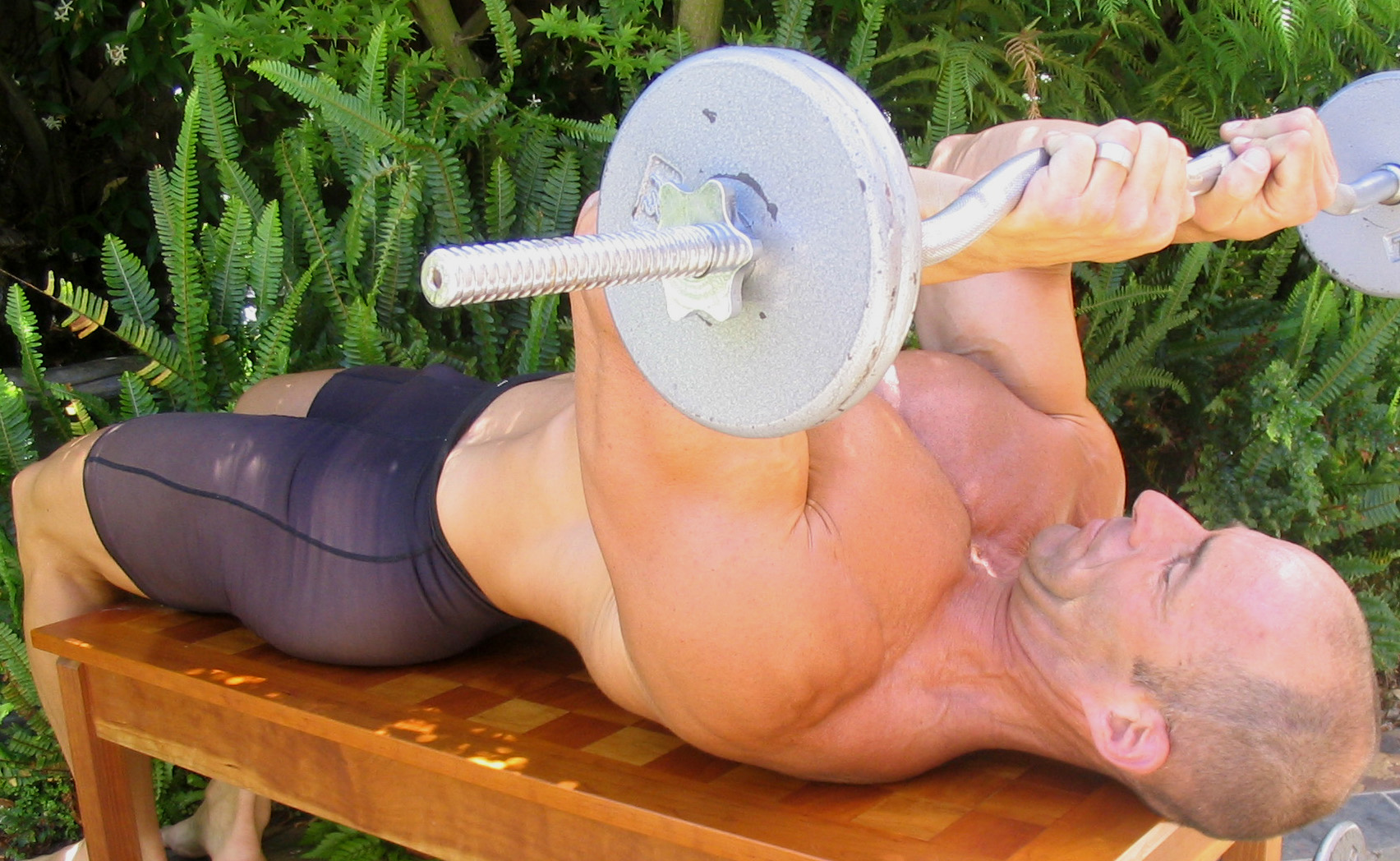
Lying triceps extension with an EZ curl bar

Instructions:

1. Lie on a flat bench with feet on the ground and head hanging just off the top of the bench, so that the edge of the bench rests in the pit between neck and head.
2. Take the barbell with an overhand grip (palms away from body) and hold it out above the head so that the arms are supporting the weight. Do not hold the arms straight over the face at 12 o'clock, but rather at an angle more like 10 o'clock, with feet at 3 o'clock. All of the weight should be on the triceps.
3. Now bend the arms at the elbow, bringing the bar down close to the top of the forehead.
4. Keep the elbows in the same position, do not let them sway outward.
5. Press back up to starting 10 o’clock position.

It is recommended to keep them the same width apart and to avoid moving your elbows too much during the exercise.

Maximum stimulus is obtained when one aims tuck in their elbows towards their chest.

== Variations ==
=== Vertical French extension ===
In this variation, the exercise is performed while standing (or sitting on a device with a low backing—that allows the shoulders full range of movement). With respect to gravity, the weight is still lifted in the same manner. With respect to the body, the weight is instead held over the head rather than over the face.

As with all weight training movements, it is important to keep the weight under smooth control on both the way down and the way up. This exercise can be performed standing, sitting or lying on one's back. As with most weight training exercises, it is recommended to start off with a lighter weight and then to gradually increase the weight as the muscles get stronger.

=== Incline EZ-bar lying tricep extensions ===
In this variation, the exercise is done lying on an incline bench with an EZ-bar which is said to hit the muscle group at a different angle stressing in a new way. Simply thinking about the position of the torso relative to the elevated arms will explain this. Being on a flat bench and raising the arms straight up as in the top of a bench press is a reference point. When inclining the torso from this position, the arms will make an obtuse angle with the lower body. This stretch is what hits the long head of the triceps hard, as the arm should be pointed as far toward your back as comfortably possible to receive the best stretch of the long head.

=== Triceps extension push-ups ===
A triceps extension push-up can be performed as a bodyweight exercise only and is thus an ideal substitution when weight lifting equipment is not available. To perform a triceps extension push-up, a person begins on the ground in a plank position with their body supported by their feet and forearms. While maintaining strict form, the triceps are extended until the person is in the standard push-up position. The triceps are then relaxed returning the body to the plank position so another repetition can be performed.

=== Other ===
Another variation is done with dumbbells, lying on the ground, touching the dumbbell to the forehead and then fully extending the arm.
