= List of calisthenics exercises =

List of bodyweight calisthenic exercises

This is a list of calisthenics exercises, consisting of bodyweight exercises that use an individual's own body mass as resistance.

== Fundamental movements ==
- Australian row
- Bear crawl
- Bulgarian split squat
- Burpee
- Calf raise
- Crunch
- Dip
- Hanging knee raise
- Hanging leg raise
- Hindu squat
- Hip bridge
- Inverted row
- Jumping jack
- Jump rope
- Lunge
- Mountain climber
- Nordic curl
- Pike push-up
- Pull over
- Pull-up and Chin-up
- Push-up
- Rope climbing
- Split jump
- Squat
- Squat thrust
- Stair climbing
- Suspension training
- Toes to bar

== Fundamental static holds ==
- Aktive hang
- Arch hold
- Crow pose
- Dead hang
- Elbow lever
- Frogstand
- Handstand
- Hollow hold
- L-sit
- Plank
- Side plank
- V-sit
- Wall handstand
- Wall sit

== Advanced movements ==
- Archer pull-up
- Archer push-up
- Back lever pull-up
- Bridge
- Dragon flag
- Front lever pull-up
- Hand walking
- Handstand push-up
- Hefesto
- Hindu push-up
- Kip-up
- Muscle-up
- Nordic hamstring curl
- One-arm pull-up and One-arm chin-up
- One-arm push-up
- Pistol squat
- Push-up variations
- Typewriter pull-up
- Windshield wipers

== Advanced static holds ==
- Back lever
- Front lever
- Human flag
- Iron cross
- Planche
- One arm handstand
- Victorian

== Core exercises ==
- Back extension
- Crunch and bicycle crunch
- Flutter kick
- Jackknife
- Leg raises and hanging leg raise
- Pelvic lift
- Russian twist
- Sit-up

== Calisthenics training equipment ==
- Barre (ballet)
- Climbing boards
- Climbing rope
- Dip bar
- Exercise ball
- Exercise mat
- Horizontal bar
- Gymnastic rings
- Jungle gym
- Parallel bars
- Parallettes
- Plyometric box
- Pole
- Pommel horse
- Power tower
- Pull-up bar
- Roman chair
- Wall bars
- weighted vest

== See also ==
- Calisthenics
- List of yoga poses
- List of exercise activities
- List of exercise equipment
- Maxalding
- Pilates
- Plyometrics
- Pole dance as exercise and pole sports
- Street workout
