= Traction (orthopedics) =

Process for straightening broken bones

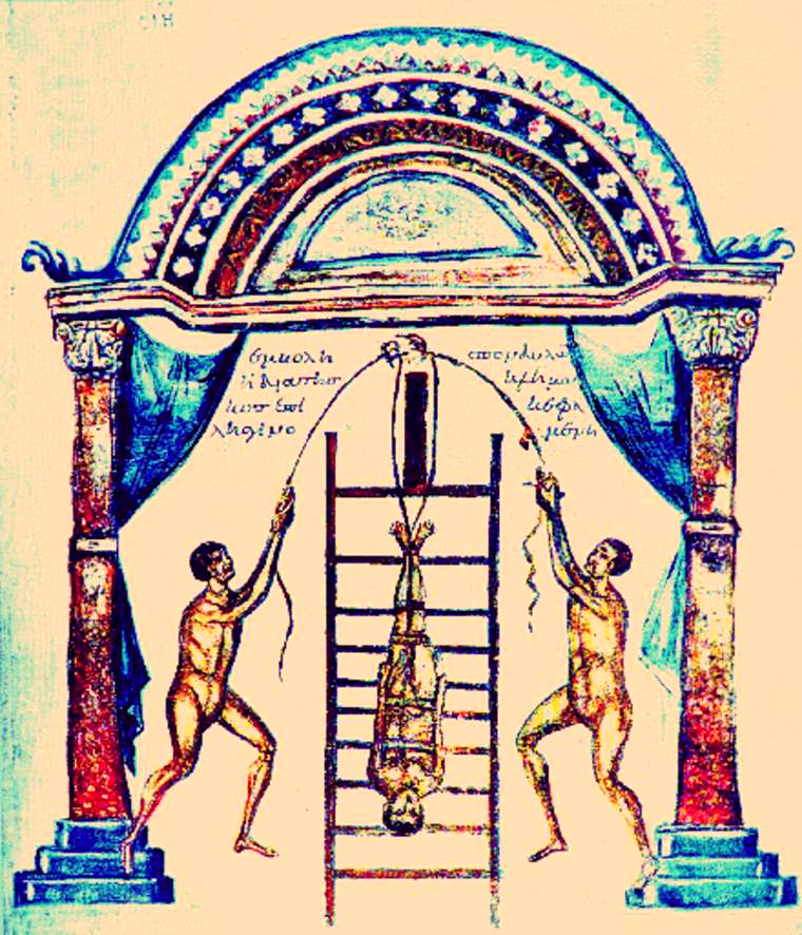
- Early Greek traction device, from a Byzantine edition of Galen's work in the 2nd century AD.
- ICD-9-CM: 93.4
- MeSH: D014143

Traction is a set of mechanisms for straightening broken bones or relieving pressure on the spine and skeletal system. There are two types of traction: skin traction and skeletal traction. They are used in orthopedic medicine.

== Techniques ==
Traction procedures have largely been replaced by more modern techniques, but certain approaches are still used today:

- Milwaukee brace
- Bryant's traction
- Buck's traction, involving skin traction. It is widely used for femoral fractures, low back pain, acetabular fractures and hip fractures. Skin traction rarely causes fracture reduction, but reduces pain and maintains the length of the bone.
- Dunlop's traction – humeral fractures in children
- Russell's traction
- Halo-gravity traction

=== Skeletal traction ===
Although the use of traction has decreased over the years, an increasing number of orthopaedic practitioners are using traction in conjunction with bracing (see Milwaukee brace).

Harrison et al. (2005) found that mirror image (opposite posture) postural corrective exercises and a new method of lumbosacral tilt traction resulted in 50% reduction in trunk tilt and were associated with nearly resolved pain intensity in this patient population. These researchers felt that their findings warranted further study in the conservative treatment of chronic low back pain and spinal disorders.

The term "skeletal traction" has been variously abbreviated as "sk. tx", "sk. trx" and "sk. tr."

=== Spinal decompression ===
Spinal traction as a means of spinal decompression is often applied without directly touching bones as other methods of traction do. This is sometimes isolated inside-out by inflatable girdles or use of the transversus abdominis muscle. It is also done in conjunction with thigh-supported flexed-hip traction (inversion chairs, back hyperextensions) or done in conjunction with whole-leg traction (boots, tables) via inverted forms of suspension.

Traction of the spine (except the cervical) also occurs with upright suspension of the body from the arms, such as with pull-ups, dips, captain's chair, chinnings (chin up exercise) or other fitness movements with the feet dangling.

=== Mechanical traction in physical therapy ===
Mechanical traction can be used for patients with cervical and lumbar spinal disorders such as cervical radiculopathy or lumbar spinal stenosis. Lumbar traction has been widely used in the clinic, previous meta-analyses have confirmed that mechanical traction in the supine position can relieve short-term pain in patients with radiculopathy. It may be applied mechanically through the use of an apparatus with two different modes: intermittent or continuous.

Physiological goals:

- Separation of vertebral bodies
- Movement of facet joints
- Expansion of intervertebral foramen
- Stretch of soft tissues

When mechanical traction is combined with other physical therapy modalities such as passive mobilization, massage, stretching and active exercises, it is an effective treatment for pain reduction in cervical or lumbar spine disorders.

Colombo et al. (2020) found that there are better results in mechanical traction therapy when compared to manual traction therapy. Furthermore, continuous traction was found to have a greater significance than intermittent traction. The suggested delivery of traction therapy was found to be mechanical traction with continuous traction.

Recent guidelines have been put forward for the use of cervical traction to treat cervical radiculopathy. Only low quality evidence has been released and the authors of these guidelines encourage researchers to intensify studies on tractions effect on cervical radiculopathy. Researchers have also demonstrated lumbar traction to be advantageous in treating low back pain. Three studies in 2017 confirmed an increase of nutrient and water flow into the intervertebral discs after traction treatment.

== Purpose ==
The purpose of traction is to:

- Regain normal length and alignment of involved bone
- Lessen or eliminate muscle spasms
- Relieve pressure on nerves, especially spinal nerves
- Prevent or reduce skeletal deformities or muscle contractures
- To provide a fusiform tamponade around a bleeding vessel

In most cases traction is only one part of the treatment plan of a patient needing such therapy. The physician's order will contain:

- Type of traction
- Amount of weight to be applied
- Frequency of neurovascular checks if more frequent than every four hours
- Site care of inserted pins, wires, or tongs
- The site and care of straps, harnesses and halters
- The inclusion of any other physical restraints / straps or appliances (e.g., mouth guard)
- The discontinuation of traction

== Future ==
The variability of traction delivery protocols causes a gap that may be the reason for negative conclusions that traction has no positive effects. A key to the future success of traction may be finding the proper therapeutic dosage levels. Suboptimal dosage choices may be a key for the negative conclusions on traction. Different dosage levels for aspects such as traction force, traction rhythm, duration of treatment, and frequency could be the key to providing efficient effects. Proper dosage levels for any therapeutic treatment will be vital for recovery efficiency. Patients may have a "directional preference" to an axial force which may be an underlying cause for positive results. Future research is needed to discover if directional preference has a positive therapeutic effect within traction.
