= Weighted vest =

Weighted vests are used in:

- fitness training, see Weighted clothing#Vests
- therapy, see Weighted vests for children
