= Compression vest =

Compression vest may refer to:

- Compression garments, tight clothes used in sports or for medical purposes
- Weighted vests for children, items used in treating children's developmental disorders
