= Power tower (exercise) =

Exercise device

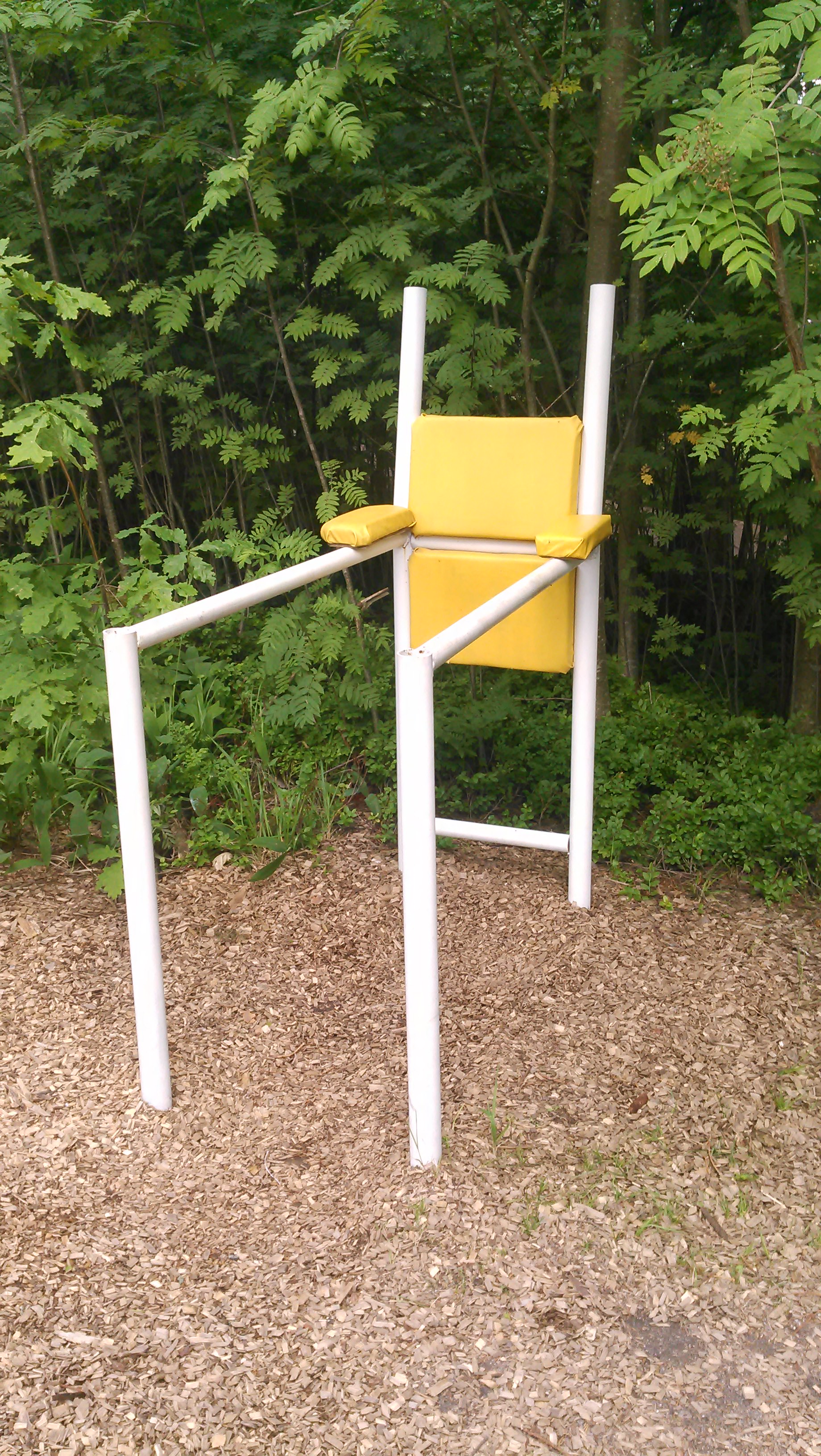
An outdoor knee raise station

A power tower, also known as a knee raise station, and as a captain's chair, is a piece of exercise equipment that allows one to build upper body and abdominal muscle strength. When only the forearm pads alone are used for performing abdominal exercises, the power tower requires minimal arm strength as it is stable and movement occurs in the hips and torso. The equipment commonly has a backrest and forearm rests that form the chair, with vertical handles at the ends of the arm rests. The word "power" comes from the addition of other powerful arm exercises such as parallel horizontal handles for performing dips, a pull-up bar attached to the top for chin-ups and pull-ups, and push-up handles that are usually found on the bottom for Atlas ("deep") push-ups.

== Exercises ==
- Chin-ups, when one's forearms are parallel with palms facing the operator closer together than shoulder-width, are a common exercise. The user works to pull his body upwards until his chin is over the bar. Chin-ups work the biceps, forearms, chest, and several upper back muscles, particularly the latissimus dorsi, trapezius, and rhomboid muscles.
- Pull-ups, when one's grip is wide with the palms facing away from the user, are also common. One attempts to pull himself up and touch his chest to the pull-up bar. Pull-ups strongly involve the latissimus dorsi muscle.
- Dips, exercises in which one 'dips' oneself between parallel bars, making sure to never bend the elbows less than 90 degrees, are also used to strengthen the triceps and chest. Keeping the torso vertical can increase the amount of use of many of the involved muscles.
- Deep or Atlas pushups use the triceps and chest more thoroughly than standard pushups.

The knee raise exercise will work the lower abdominals, and can also work the obliques (see abdominal external oblique muscle and abdominal internal oblique muscle) if one twists the torso during the exercise. This version of the knee raise has been praised by fitness communities for its effectiveness, as working the abdominal muscles. Previous research has shown that a captain's chair knee raise will elicit a greater electromyography (EMG) response than the standard crunch. This means that the knee raise in the captain's chair will have more activation in the muscle than the standard crunch. However, 2013 research has shown that it has the same EMG activity as the standard crunch. This newer research is yet to be published. One aspect that both researches agree on is that there is no difference in activation of upper rectus abdominis and lower rectus abdominis, as it is speculated that the muscle acts as one and cannot be differentiated.

Advanced users may increase resistance by wearing a weighted vest or ankle weights, holding a dumbbell between the feet, kettlebells on the toes, a resistance band tied from one's feet to the bottom of the tower, or other heavy weights.

== See also ==
- Weighted clothing
- Bodyweight exercise
