= Wanda Quilhot =

Chilean lichenologist (1929–2023)

- Born: Wanda Quilhot Palma; 1929
- Died: September 2023 (aged 93–94)
- Education: University of Paris
- Occupations: Professor of Biology and Natural Sciences, University of Chile; Professor, Faculty of Medicine in the School of Chemistry and Pharmacy, at the Universidad de Valparaíso
- Years active: 1959–present
- Known for: Lichenology

Wanda Quilhot (1929 – September 2023) was a Chilean biologist, most noted for her work in lichenology. She was among the first women scientists allowed to participate in research in Antarctica with the International Council for Science (ICSU), conducting research there beginning in 1963. Three lichen species Menegazzia wandae, Pseudocyphellaria wandae, and Strigula wandae have been named in her honor. The Latin American Group of Lichenology has created a prize in her name to recognize research excellence in the field of lichenology. Quilhot died in September 2023.

== Early life ==
Wanda Quilhot Palma was born in Chile in 1930. As a child, she wanted to be a nurse, but after a childhood accident left her in a cast and with a traction device, forcing her to remain bedfast for five years, she changed her mind. Unable to study during her confinement, by the time she finished her secondary education, Quilhot was twenty-four. At the time, women were not encouraged to pursue university degrees, but her sister an uncle, Octavio Palma, a noted Chilean educator, advocated for her to pursue further education. In 1955, she enrolled in biology courses and worked at the newly created Institute of Zoological Research, under Guillermo Mann, finishing her degree in 1959.

== Career ==
That same year, Quilhot began teaching as a professor of biology and natural sciences at the University of Chile. Winning a scholarship to attend the University of Paris and study plant physiology and algae in the Faculty of Sciences. After spending three years, studying, she left without finishing her PhD, because she missed her husband.

In the summer season of 1963–1964, Quilhot and Nelly Lafuente become some of the first women to conduct research in Antarctica. Women had long been barred from working in Antarctica as it was assumed that they lacked the stamina and mental toughness to deal with the inhospitable climate and working conditions.

In 1952 the International Council for Science began planning the International Geophysical Year 1957–1958 with the idea of including women scientists and Lafuente and Quilhot were the first two women from Chile to work in Antarctica. Working for the Instituto Antarctico Chileno at the Bernado O’Higgins Station on the northeast edge of the peninsula, Lafuente evaluated bird reproduction, while Quihot, studied the local fauna.

Quilhot's research focused on microfauna, and the bryophytes and soil-forming microorganisms which were causing degradation of the soil. The research she conducted in Antarctica created a fascination with lichens for Quihot, which became the focus of her work for the next forty years.

Quilhot studied with groups of international scholars researching various lichen species at diverse altitudinal and latitudinal environments, examining the different effects of UVA radiation and UVB radiation. She has written over 200 articles in scientific journals and three lichen species Menegazzia wandae, Pseudocyphellaria wandae, and Strigula wandae have been named in her honor. She teaches in the Faculty of Medicine in the School of Chemistry and Pharmacy, at the Universidad de Valparaíso. At the 12th Congress of the Latin American Group of Lichenology Spanish: Grupo Latinoamericano de Liquenología, held in Quito, Ecuador in 2016, she was awarded the Vainio Prize for her research on lichens and the Wanda Quilhot Palma Prize was established to recognize research excellence in the field of lichenology.

== See also ==
- Category:Taxa named by Wanda Quilhot
