= Burpee (exercise) =

Full body exercise

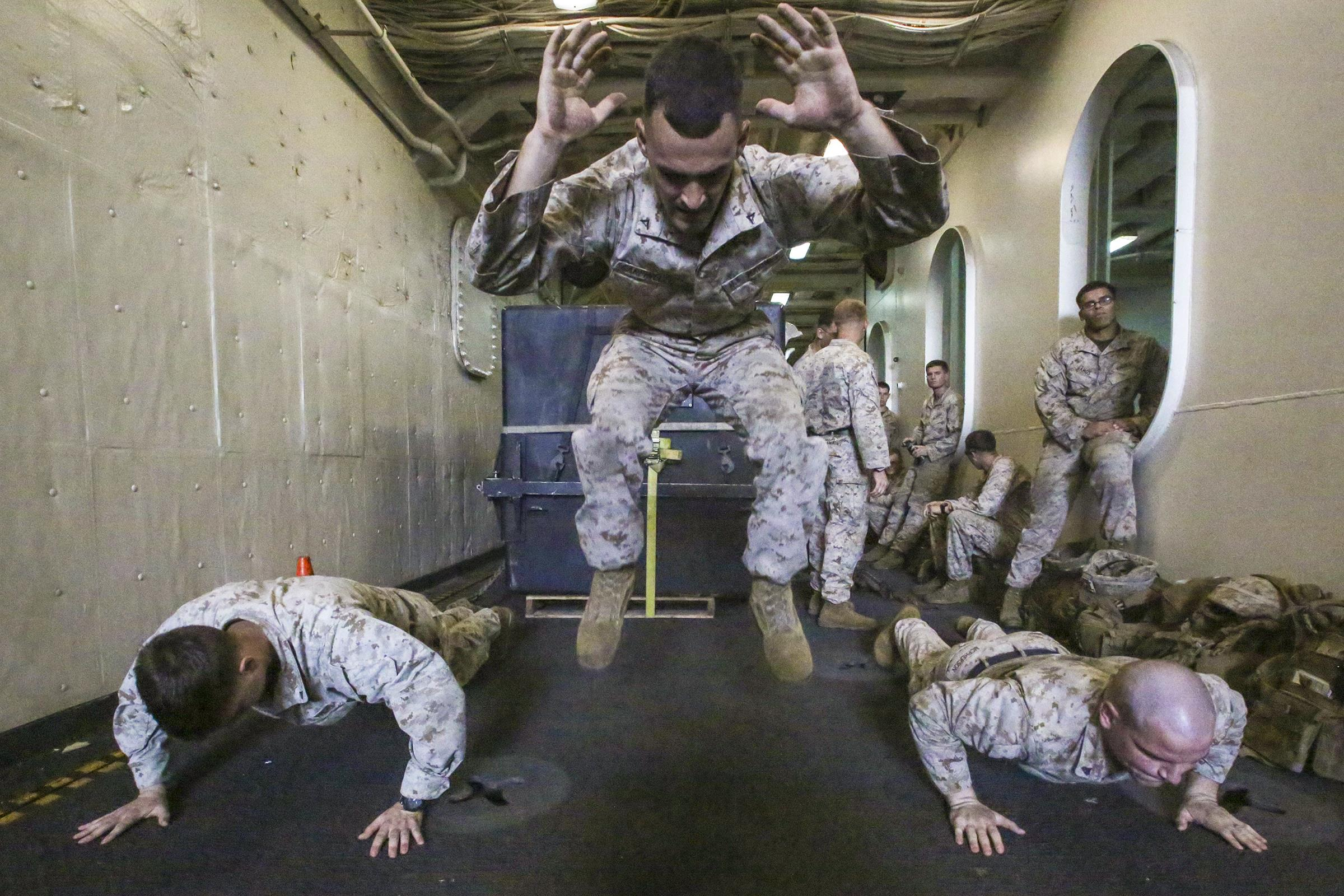
Marines do burpees aboard USS San Antonio in 2016

The burpee, a squat thrust with an additional stand between repetitions, is a full body exercise used in strength training. The movement itself is primarily an anaerobic exercise, but when done in succession over a longer period can be utilized as an aerobic exercise.

The basic movement as described by its namesake, physiologist Royal H. Burpee, is performed in four steps from a standing position and known as a "four-count burpee":

1. Move into a squat position with your hands on the ground.
2. Kick your feet back into an extended plank position, while keeping your arms extended.
3. Immediately return your feet into squat position.
4. Stand up from the squat position.

One modification is to step back into a plank instead of kicking back.

Moves 2 and 3 constitute a squat thrust. Many variants of the basic burpee exist, and they often include a push-up and a jump.

== Origin ==
Demonstration of a burpee

Variant of a burpee that includes a push-up and a jump.

The exercise was invented in 1939 by US physiologist Royal Huddleston Burpee Sr., who used it in the burpee test to assess fitness. Burpee earned a PhD in applied physiology from Teachers College, Columbia University in 1940 and created the "burpee" exercise as part of his PhD thesis as a quick and simple fitness test, which may be used as a measure of agility and coordination. The original burpee was a "four-count burpee" consisting of movements through four different positions, and in the fitness test, the burpee was performed four times, with five heart rate measurements taken before and after the four successive burpees to measure the efficiency of the heart at pumping blood and how quickly the heart rate returns to normal.

Burpee was a veteran of the First World War. After the war, he earned his doctorate in physiology at Columbia University. In the 1930s, he developed the Burpee test.

The exercise was popularized when, in 1942, the U.S. Army adopted the exercise as part of its physical fitness test, used to assess the fitness level of recruits when the US entered World War II. Although the original test was not designed to be performed at high volume, the Army used the burpee to test how many times it can be performed by a soldier in 20 seconds – 8 burpees in 20 seconds is considered poor, 10 is fair, 13 or more excellent. The Army also considered that a soldier fit enough for the rigor of war should be able to perform 40 or 50 burpees non-stop in an easy rhythm.

During World War II, he worked as the overseas program director for the United Service Organizations (USO). From 1946 to 1964, Burpee served as Executive Director of the Bronx-Union Branch of the Young Men's Christian Association (YMCA) in New York City.

== Variants ==
Box-jump burpee
The athlete jumps onto a box, rather than straight up and down.

Dumbbell burpee
The athlete holds a pair of dumbbells while performing the exercise.

Eight-count push-up or double burpee
The athlete performs two push-ups after assuming the plank position. This cancels the drive from landing after the jump and makes the next jump harder. Each part of the burpee might be repeated to make it even harder.
Hindu push-up burpee
Instead of a regular push-up, do a Hindu push-up.
Jump-over burpee
The athlete jumps over an obstacle between burpees.
Knee push-up burpee
The athlete bends their knees and rests them on the ground before performing the push-up.
Long-jump burpee
The athlete jumps forward, not upward.
Muscle-up burpee
Combine a muscle-up (a variation of a pull-up) with the jump or do a muscle-up instead of the jump.
One-armed burpee
The athlete uses only one arm for the whole exercise including the push-up.
One-leg burpee
The athlete stands on one leg, bends at the waist and puts hands on ground so they are aligned with shoulders. Next jump back with the standing leg to plank position. Jump forward with the one leg that was extended, and do a one-leg jump. Repeat on opposite side.

== World records ==
=== Chest-to-ground burpees ===
==== One minute ====
On April 29, 2023, in Quebec City, Quebec, Canada, Philippe Jouan achieved a record 38 chest-to-ground burpees in one minute.

==== One hour ====
On June 25, 2021, in Singapore, Cassiano Rodrigues Laureano achieved a record 951 chest-to-ground burpees in one hour.

==== 12 hours ====
On July 7, 2019, in Milford, Michigan, Army ROTC Cadet Bryan Abell set the Guinness World Record for most chest-to-ground burpees performed in 12 hours by completing 4,689 burpees. On December 1, 2019, this record was broken and the new record was set as 5,234 by Samuel Finn from Canada. On May 11, 2024, a new record of 8,523 burpees in 12 hours was set in Narbonne, France, by Joseph Salas.

== See also ==
- Sun Salutation - a sequence of yoga postures that bears some similarities.
- Hindu push-up - another similar sequence.
