= Dip bar =

Piece of fitness equipment for doing dips

A dip bar being used to do the dip exercise.

A dip bar is a piece of fitness equipment that consists of a U-shaped bar, usually about 25 mm (1 in) in diameter, which surrounds the user's body at the waist. It is designed for the performance of, and named after, the dip exercise. Weights can be added to a weight belt to increase the intensity.

In addition to this exercise, much like the trap bar can be used for deadlifts, a dip bar has other potential uses. It can, for example, be used to do handstand pushups, or the forearms can lie on it to be used as a captain's chair for doing things such as knee raises. When dip bars have clearance under the handles, they also allow the exerciser to do things like hip abduction leg raises, to work muscles like the gluteus medius.

Dip bars that are high enough can also be used via having the hands below the bar instead of on top of them, using the finger flexors to hang on. They can be used to hold the very top motion of a pull-up. Generally, they are not high enough to allow significant range of motion in this movement, even if the knees are bent or pulled to the chest. They may also be used to perform supine rows.

== See also ==
- Parallettes
- Rings (gymnastics)
- Chin-up bar
