= Parallettes =

Gymnastics device

A set of parallettes constructed from PVC pipe.

Parallettes are small gymnastics devices, employed in pairs, used primarily to simulate the parallel bars that can be found in professional gymnasiums. Parallettes are similar to push-up bars or dip bars, but they are generally longer than the former and lower to the ground than the latter.

Aside from their appeal as equipment for gymnasts, parallettes are also appropriate for other athletes who wish to develop strength by means of bodyweight exercises.

Typical exercises done on parallettes include L-sits, V-sits, planche style holds, handstand presses, and handstand pushups. Body weight is always supported on the hands, but some parallette exercises are excellent core and leg strengtheners as well.

Although parallettes can be purchased from a number of commercial sources, they are simple to fabricate from commonly available materials such as PVC pipe. Consequently, both professional and home gyms will often utilize low-cost, "homemade" parallettes.

== See also ==
- Gymnastic rings
