= Menegazzia wandae =

Scientific classification
- Domain: Eukaryota
- Kingdom: Fungi
- Division: Ascomycota
- Class: Lecanoromycetes
- Order: Lecanorales
- Family: Parmeliaceae
- Genus: Menegazzia
- Species: M. wandae

Binomial name
- Menegazzia wandae Bjerke (2001)

Species of lichen

Menegazzia wandae is a species of foliose lichen found in South America. It was described as new to science in 2001 by Norwegian lichenologist Jarle Bjerke, and was named after the Chilean lichenologist, Wanda Quilhot. The lichen is found in Chile between latitudes 38°30´S and 46°40´S.

== See also ==
- List of Menegazzia species
