= Hug machine =

Device to calm hypersensitive persons

A hug machine, also known as a hug box, a squeeze machine, or a squeeze box, is a therapeutic device designed to calm hypersensitive persons, usually autistic individuals. The device was invented by Temple Grandin to administer deep-touch pressure, a type of physical stimulation often self-administered by autistic individuals as a means of self-soothing.

Autistic people often have sensory processing disorder, which entails abnormal levels of stimulation of the senses (such as hypersensitivity). Because of difficulty with social interactions, it can be uncomfortable or impractical to turn to other human beings for comfort, including hugs. Grandin addressed this by designing the hug machine, in part to help her own anxiety and sensory sensitivity.

== Description ==
The hug machine consists of two hinged side-boards, each four by three feet (120 cm by 90 cm) with thick soft padding, which form a V-shape, with a complex control box at one end and heavy-duty tubes leading to an air compressor. The user lies or squats between the side-boards for as long or short of a period as desired. Using pressure exerted by the air compressor and controlled by the user, the side-boards apply deep pressure stimulation evenly across the lateral parts of the body. The machine and its development are depicted in the biopic Temple Grandin.

== History ==
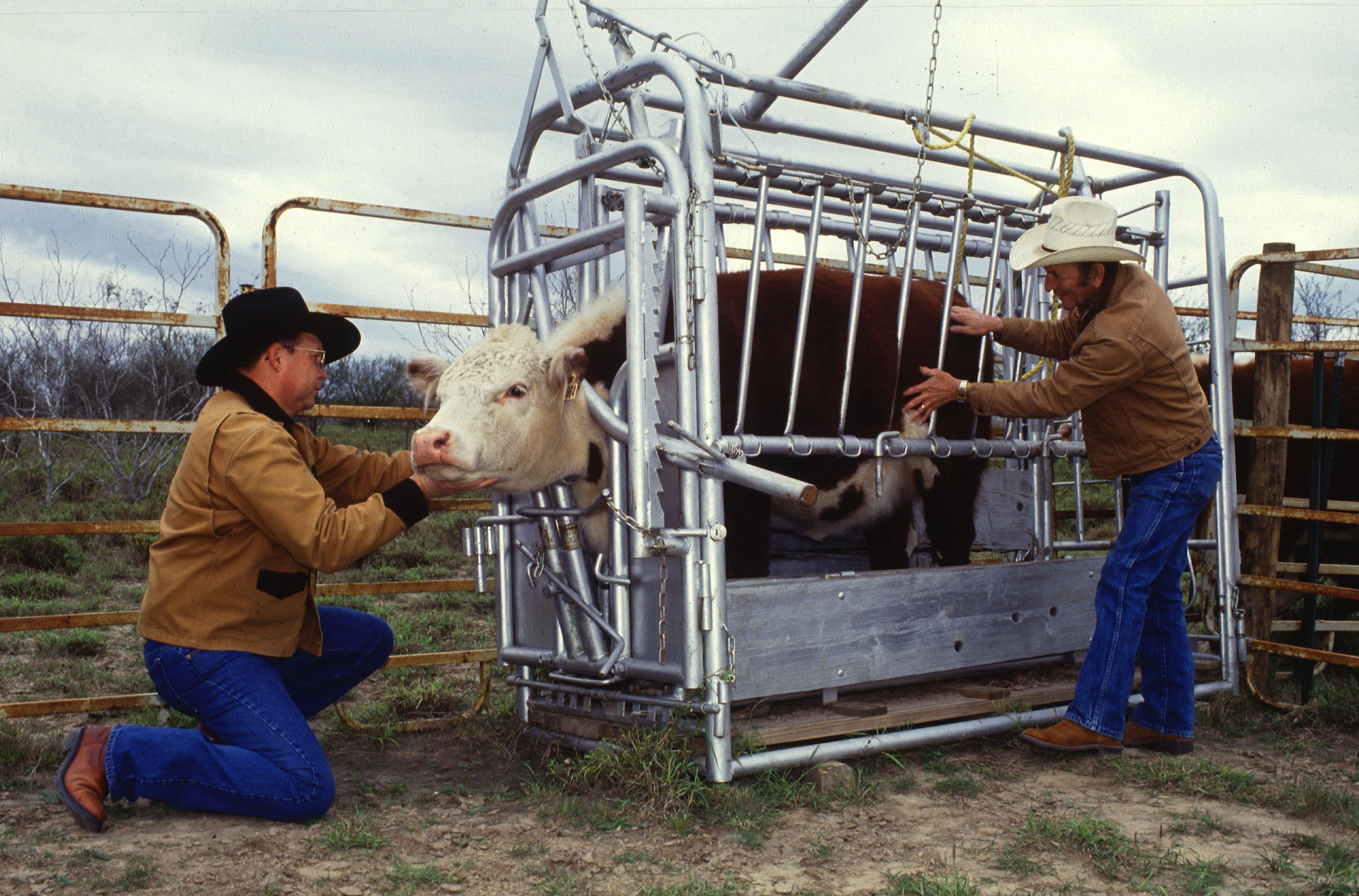
Cattle squeeze chutes, such as the portable one pictured here, were Grandin's inspiration for her hug machine.

The inventor of the machine, Temple Grandin, realized as a young child that she would seek out deep pressure stimulation, but she felt over-stimulated when someone hugged or held her. The idea for the hug machine came to her during a visit to her aunt's Arizona ranch, where she noted the way cattle were confined in a squeeze chute for inoculation, and how some of the cattle immediately calmed down after pressure was administered. She realized that the deep pressure from the chute had a calming effect on the cattle, and she decided that something similar might well settle down her own hypersensitivity.

Initially, Grandin's device met with disapproval as psychologists at her college sought to confiscate her prototype hug machine. Her science teacher, however, encouraged her to determine the reason it helped resolve the anxiety and sensory issues.

== Efficacy ==
Several therapy programs in the United States now use hug machines, effectively achieving general calming effects among autistic people across the age spectrum. A 1995 study on the efficacy of Grandin's device, conducted by the Center for the Study of Autism, working with Willamette University in Salem, Oregon, involved ten autistic children and found a reduction in tension and anxiety. Other studies, including one by Margaret Creedon, have yielded similar results. A small pilot study by Edelson et al. (1999), published in the American Journal of Occupational Therapy, reported that the machine produced a significant reduction in tension but only a small decrease in anxiety.

Grandin continued to use her own hug box on a regular basis to provide the deep pressure necessary to relieve symptoms of her anxiety. "I concentrate on how gently I can do it", she has said. A paper Grandin wrote on her hug machine and the effects of deep pressure stimulation was published in the Journal of Child and Adolescent Psychopharmacology.

In a February 2010 Time magazine interview, Grandin stated that she no longer uses a hug machine: "It broke two years ago, and I never got around to fixing it. I'm into hugging people now."

== Squeeze chair ==
For several years in the 1990s, urban interventionist/artist Wendy Jacob worked with Grandin in developing furniture that squeezes or "hugs" users, inspired by Grandin's hug machine.

== Deep pressure ==
Other deep pressure techniques were developed. Systematic reviews showed that they had positive effects but the quality of the studies was too low to confirm this effect. The pressure can be controlled by the person themselves. Focus groups and simulations will be necessary to confirm acceptability compared to others and trials will be useful to confirm efficacy of this method.

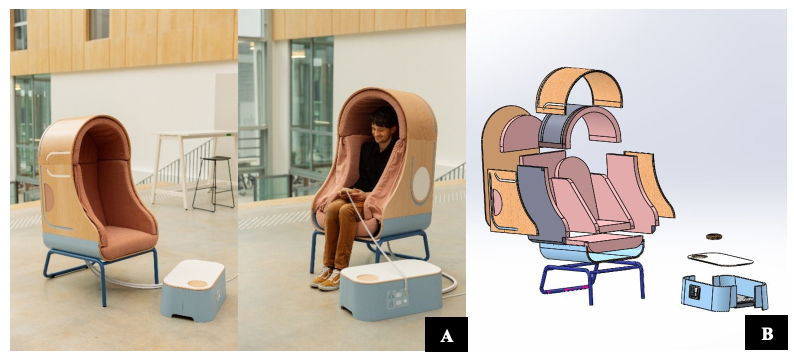
(A) OTO, a compressive armchair to induce deep pressure in autistic children (final product) and (B) presentation of the different components of the OTO chair

== See also ==
- Weighted blanket
- Swaddling
