= Leg raise =

Strength training exercise

The leg raise in lying position

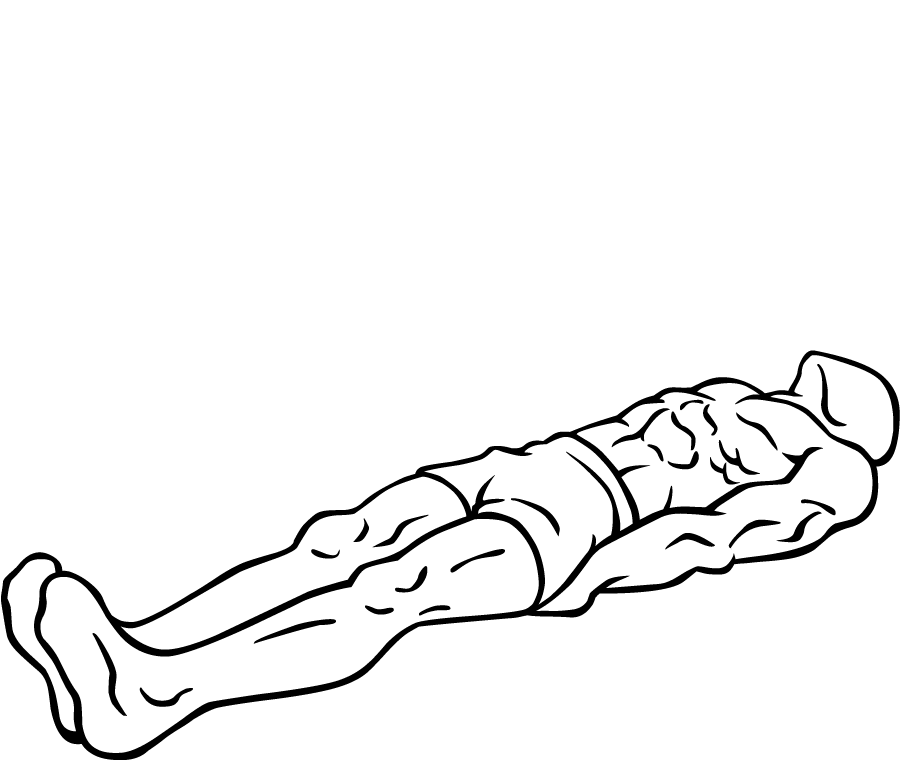
Starting position

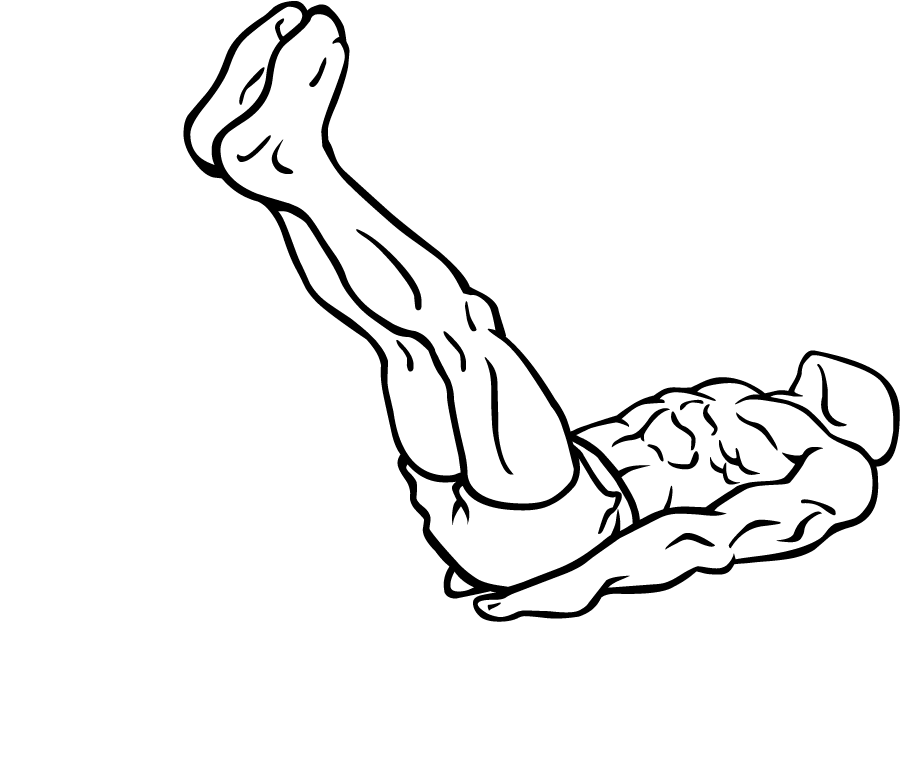
Finishing position

The leg raise is a strength training exercise which targets the iliopsoas (the anterior hip flexors). Because the abdominal muscles are used isometrically to stabilize the body during the motion, leg raises are also often used to strengthen the rectus abdominis muscle and the internal and external oblique muscles.

== Angles ==
=== Lying ===
The lying leg raise is done by lying on the floor on the back. It is done without apparatus except possibly cushions, or weights for added resistance.

Practitioners generally caution to keep the lower back in contact with the floor and place hands to sides or under lower back for support.

Due to leverage, the hardest portion of a supine (lying) leg raise is generally the first part when the legs are on the floor, as this is when the femur is parallel with the earth and perpendicular to the pull of gravity.

=== Side-lying ===
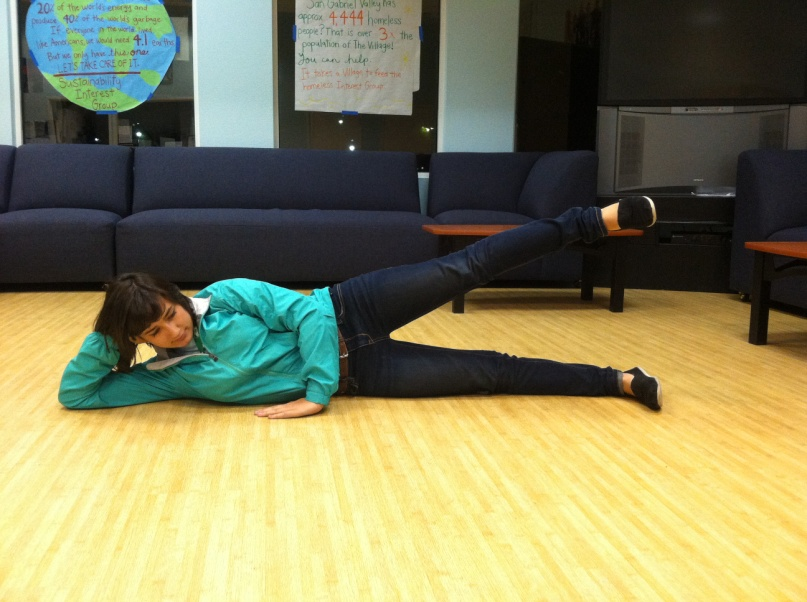

Side-lying leg raises target the hip abductors within the outer thigh. They are performed by lying on the side with support coming from one hand placed on the ground and the opposite foot placed on the ground in front of the lower leg. With the top leg slightly flexed and resting, the bottom leg is abducted upwards against gravity and relaxed down to the ground.

=== Seated ===
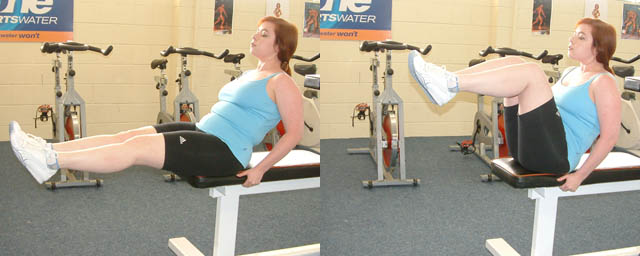
A "knee raise" type of seated leg raise, with flexed knee joint.

A seated leg raise is halfway between a lying raise and a hanging/suspended/tractioned one. They are done seated on an elevated surface. Usually the hands are placed on the surface (or arm rests) and bear some of the body's weight to lessen the weight borne on the buttocks and increase abdominal recruitment.

=== Hanging ===
Leg raises can also be performed hanging onto an overhead bar. These are known as hanging leg raises and are more challenging than lying leg raises.

They can also be performed on other apparatuses such as dip bars and captain's chairs, which also involve the torso being suspended in the air, except that the stress through the arms is different.

This variation of leg raise allows the pelvis to freely rotate. It is generally the more difficult variation for the abdominal muscles due to having to support the pelvic weight as opposed to simply stabilizing its alignment.

Alongside this however, it is also potentially the easiest to use bad form on, because users may use a swinging motion to 'cheat' by building up momentum. If the abs are not properly engaged, the spine can easily hyperextend and go into anterior pelvic tilt. It should be going into posterior pelvic tilt if the movement is being done to target the rectus abdominis.

This movement can also be done with "ab slings" which hold the humeri in ~90 degrees of shoulder flexion. This allows one to do a more traditional crunch by bringing the knees up to touch the elbows. It is however possible to assist in this movement by using the lats and other muscles to perform shoulder extension.

== Force ==
The demands of force on the muscles can be increased through altered posture or apparatus.

=== Joints ===
Extending the knee joint (often called a straight leg raise) increases the demands of leverage on both hip and spine flexors. It also allows the rectus femoris muscle to contribute, for both the supine straight leg raise and the hanging straight leg raise versions, although the muscle will be in active insufficiency in the latter case.

The generic term "leg raise" usually indicates a bended knee, though the term "knee raise" is used to distinguish it from the category which includes both variations.

=== Weights ===
The exercise can also be done weighted, such as wearing ankle weights or weighted boots, holding a dumbbell between the feet, or slipping one's feet through kettlebells. These weights are also affected by the increased leverage of a straightened knee.

== Form ==
=== Range ===
Some prefer to lift as high as possibly through a full range of motion for each repetition. Others do partial range repetitions to focus on more difficult portions of the exercise (generally when the leg is parallel with the ground).

"Leg raise" usually indicates that the mobilization only occurs in the joints of the leg. Both ab muscles (rectus and transversus abdominis) are used to isometrically stabilize the spine to resist extension and posterior pelvic tilt that would otherwise occur with the legs lifted in front.

When the lumbar spine flexes, the rectus abdominis is worked dynamically instead of isometrically, increasing its activity, but lessening the stabilizing effect of the TA. This variation is called a leg-hip raise.

Leg-hip raises are usually done suspended as the pelvis is more free to rotate. With lying/seated leg raises, the friction between the posterior of the pelvis with the surface it is in contact with impedes rotation.

== Weighted variations ==
Leg raises may also be performed with the addition of a weight. This is usually held between the feet and may be a small dumbbell or medicine ball. A large amount of weight can be lifted if the "knee raise" style is used in a standing position. This exercise is also known as a thigh raise and involves the holding of a barbell, dumbbell or sandbag upon the thigh. The exerciser raises their thigh and lifts the weight before placing their foot on the ground again. A similar range of movement against resistance can be achieved with a multi-hip machine. As it engages and strengthens the hip flexors it is a useful exercise for sprinters and jumpers.

== See also ==
- Flutter kicks
