= Weighted blanket =

Type of blanket

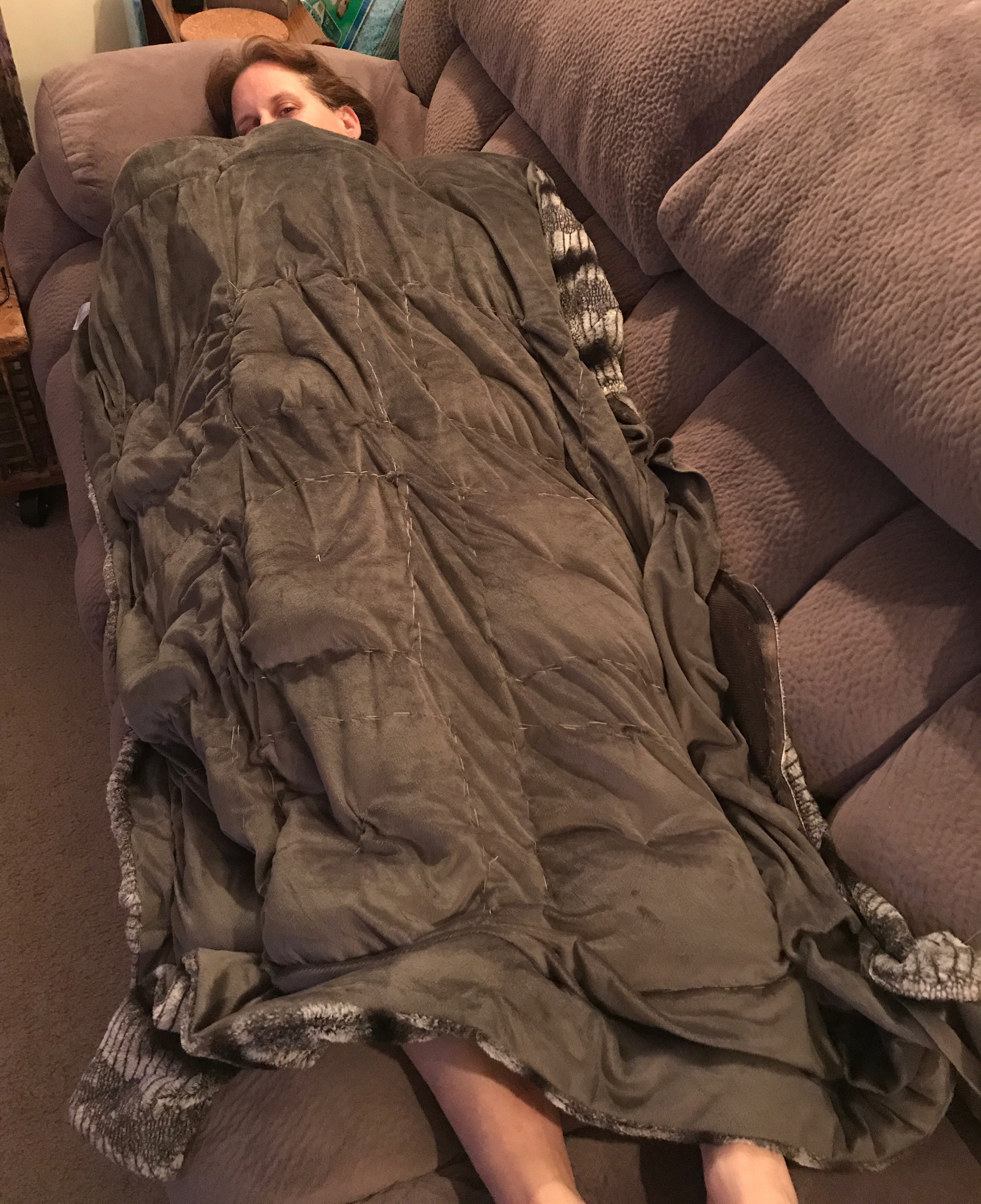
A woman underneath a DIY 12 pound (5.4kg) weighted blanket.

A weighted blanket is an especially heavy blanket that is used to aid sleep and reduce anxiety. Initially, weighted blankets were most commonly used in deep pressure therapy to assist autistic people, individuals with dementia, and mental health conditions. They have subsequently become a mass-market product. Scientific evidence does not support their use as an aid for insomnia, and they can be dangerous, particularly for children.

== Deep pressure therapy ==
Deep pressure therapy (DPT) or deep touch pressure (DTP) is a sensory integration therapy used to help calm neurodivergent people with sensory processing sensitivity through the application of a firm, gentle pressure to the body. DPT may be applied with weighted blankets, but also with weighted vests, hug machines, or a heavy pet. DPT provides a soothing sensation akin to a warm, reassuring embrace that can help regulate the nervous system and decrease stress.

== Uses ==
Weighted blankets are used in occupational therapy in an attempt to help individuals improve their emotional and physical regulation. Specifically, weighted blankets are used in a type of occupational therapy called "sensory integration therapy", which helps autistic people or people with mental conditions focus on sensory experiences. Weighted blankets are just one of the many tools occupational therapists use to provide "deep-touch pressure", a form of physical stimulation that, according to experts, may help individuals regulate their emotions and behavior.

Although early research indicates that weighted blankets may be an appropriate therapeutic tool for reducing anxiety, reviews in current medical literature note that research in this area is sparse.

Other studies have indicated that weighted blankets may reduce anxiety and, as a result, allow the user to fall asleep more quickly. However, in relation to insomnia, medical experts note that more research is needed, as there is not yet enough evidence to prove that the products reduce symptoms. Additionally, there is a significant placebo effect, which will need to be accounted for in future studies.

== History ==
Some of the earliest research into the form of deep-touch pressure that weighted blankets use began in 1965, when an American scientist with autism, Temple Grandin, invented the hug machine. She later used it to study the calming effects of deep-touch pressure in other autistic people.

Keith and Lynda Zivalich produced the first version of a weighted blanket in 1997, when they created a bean-filled comforter now called the "Magic Weighted Blanket". They made their first sale in December 1998.

The first official study of weighted blankets as an avenue for deep-touch pressure occurred shortly after, in 1999. Tina Champagne, an occupational therapist, began researching them as a coping device for individuals in the broader special-needs community. Weighted blankets continued to increase in popularity in the special needs community, and several companies began creating product lines throughout the early- and mid-2000s.

However, it wasn't until 2017 that weighted blankets secured mainstream popularity, when the science news site Futurism launched a Kickstarter campaign for a product called the Gravity Blanket and raised almost $5 million. The company sold more than 128,000 units by putting a new spin on the product and marketing it to the public as a sleep aid and stress reducer.

In 2018, Time magazine named "blankets that ease anxiety" one of the best inventions of 2018 and cited the Gravity Blanket specifically. They noted that although Futurism didn't invent the weighted blanket, the company perfected the art of marketing it to the masses. Along these same lines, The Atlantic linked the Gravity Blanket's success, and the subsequent rise in weighted blankets, to a new way of describing and marketing their uses, describing the Gravity Blanket as a story about "the promise of life-changing comfort to the meditation-app-using, Instagram-shopping masses". The New Yorker linked the Gravity Blanket's popularity to both good timing and marketing, arguing that the previous years saw a marked rise in feelings of stress and worry in the United States and that it's "not coincidental that Gravity’s Kickstarter success arrived deep into a period when many Americans were beginning their e-mails with reflexive, panicked condolences about the news".

Retail stores around the world began selling variations of the blankets throughout 2018 and, by the end of the year, weighted blankets were on practically every gift guide on the internet.

Since securing popularity, medical doctors have noted that, while some findings have been intriguing, more research is needed to verify the efficacy of the products as sleep aids and stress reducers.

== Composition ==
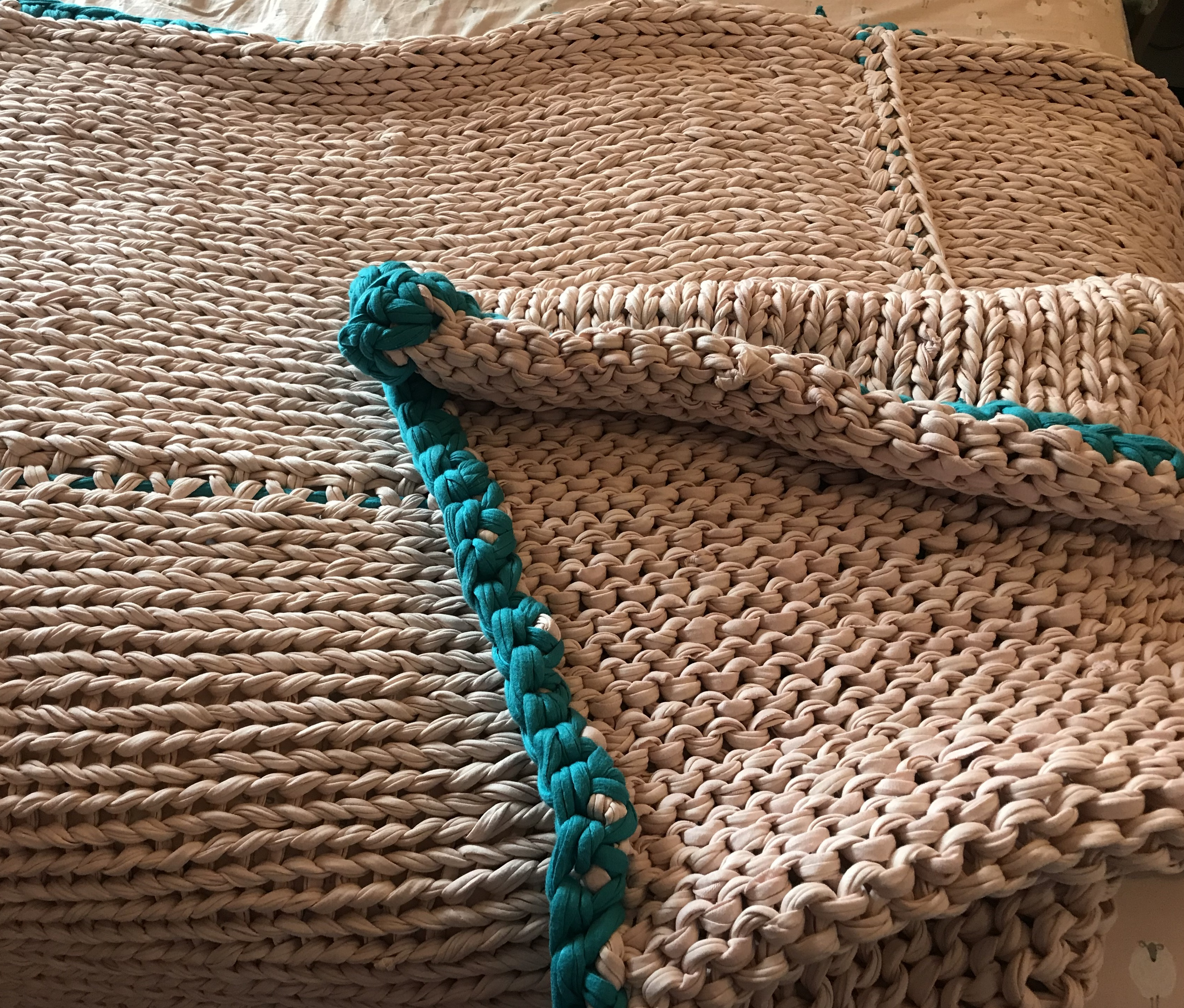
DIY knitted weighted blanket (approximately 6.7kg / 14.7lb), made using double-strand of t-shirt yarn. Created in 4 pieces, which can be deconstructed for washing.

A common type of weighted blanket is made out of a fabric blanket divided into small compartments, which are then filled with plastic pellets or small beads. Plastic-filled blankets are typically more affordable, but bulkier; and some consumers prefer to avoid plastics for personal or environmental reasons. Glass or metal are considered less likely to cause allergic reactions; and due to their inherent density, less bulk is required to achieve the same weight.

All-fabric types of weighted blankets are also available. They are often knitted or crocheted with thick and heavy materials, such as T-shirt yarn (also known as "tarn" or "T-yarn", made out of T-shirt weight cotton), which is sometimes available as recycled materials, deadstock, or byproducts of the garment industry.

== Safety and efficacy ==
A 2018 systematic review, which investigated the effectiveness of using weighted blankets to decrease anxiety and insomnia, found that weighted blankets may be an appropriate therapeutic tool in reducing anxiety in limited settings and populations. However, the researchers also found that there is not enough evidence to suggest they are helpful with insomnia, and investigating their use was hampered by inconsistent practice.

Scientists caution that studies on the safety of weighted blankets in healthy adults cannot be generalized to children, and even less so to children with disabilities. Weighted blankets may be over 25 pounds (11.5 kg) and, due to this excessive weight, improper use of weighted blankets carries risk of harm to children, having been responsible for at least one child's death. For infants, the American Academy of Pediatrics' 2022 safe sleep recommendations state that weighted swaddles, weighted clothing and other weighted objects should not be used on or near a sleeping baby, and in 2023 the academy urged the U.S. Consumer Product Safety Commission not to develop voluntary safety standards for weighted infant sleep products.

Weighted blankets are widely recommended for autistic children by support groups and in online forums. A 2013 review found no relevant scientific studies on the topic; there was insufficient evidence to support this use as of 2019.

== Care ==
Due to size and weight, weighted blankets are often difficult to launder (some are also made of materials that cannot be machine-washed). Therefore, many blankets are sold alongside a machine-washable cover. Additionally, the blanket's weight may exceed the maximum load allowed by a washing machine, and should always be checked in advance. A delicate wash in cold water is generally preferred, as this preserves the properties of the padding material and prevents damage to the weighted pellets/beads. In most cases, how often to wash a weighted blanket depends on how the owner uses it.

Special care should also be exercised when drying a weighted blanket. Most manufacturers recommend flat drying the blankets. This can be achieved by using a flat surface, laying down a few towels to soak the excess water, and laying the weighted blanket on top to dry. Hang drying is discouraged because the weighted blanket may lose its shape and reduce its lifespan. Gentle air drying in the machine may be possible, depending on the weighted blanket filling and padding material. Plastic and synthetic fabric or padding materials may lose their properties due to excessive air temperature.

== See also ==
- Weighted vests for children
