= L-sit =

Gymnastics and Calisthenics skill

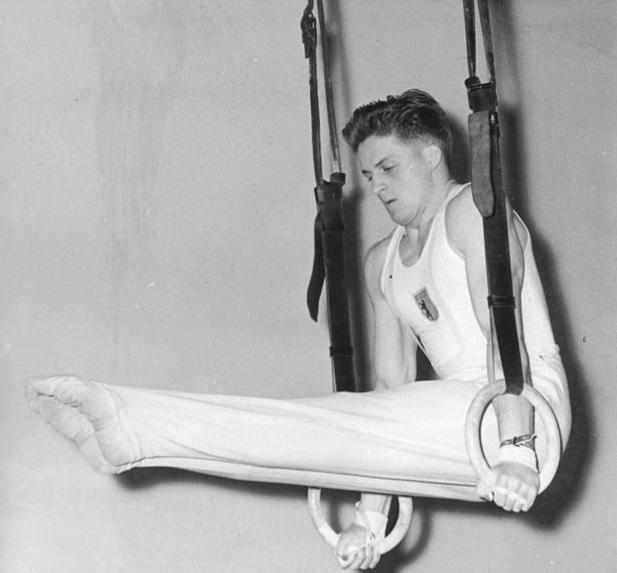
L-sit performed on rings

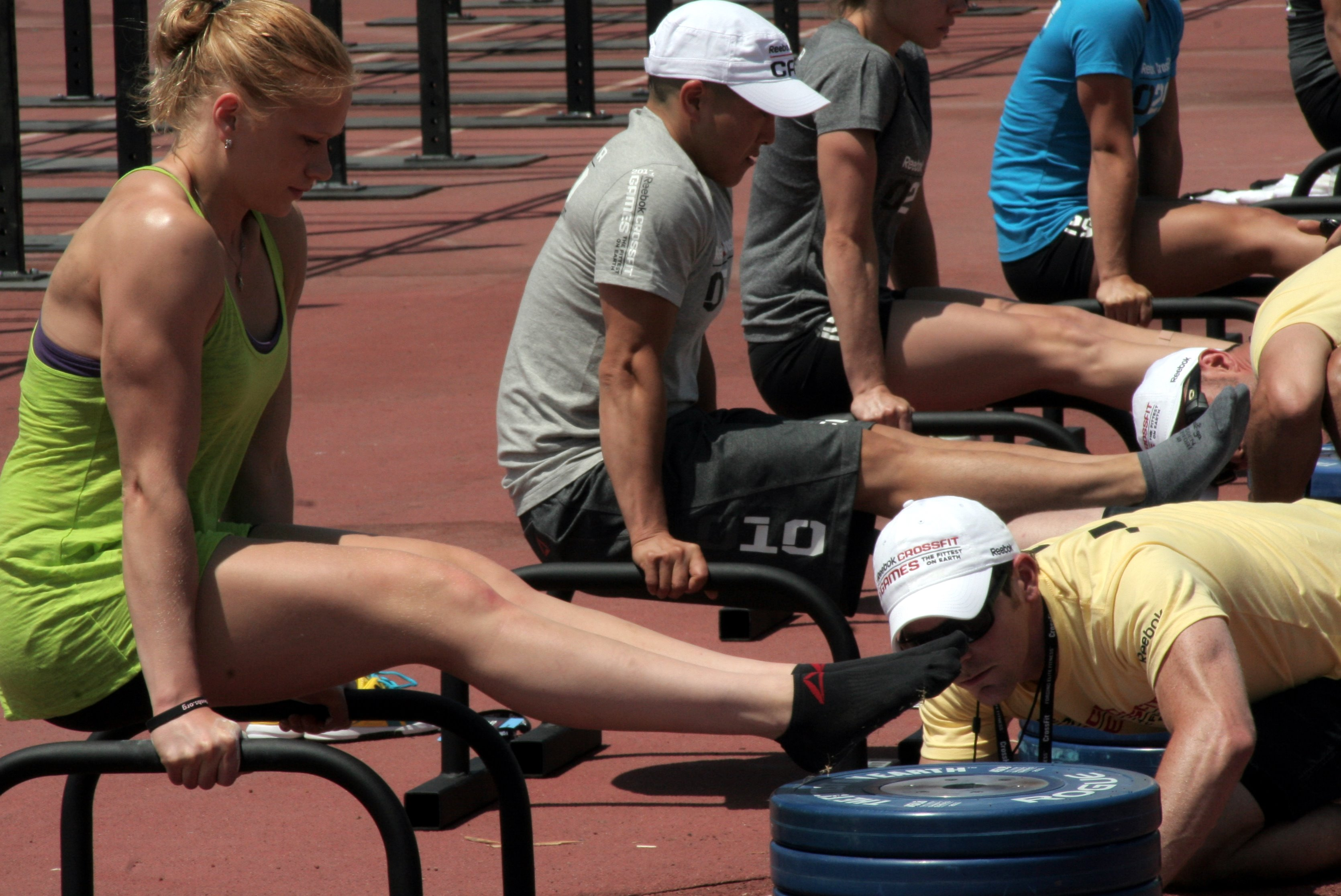
L-sits on parallettes

The L-sit is an acrobatic body position in which all body weight rests on the hands, with the torso held in a slightly forward-leaning orientation, with legs held horizontally so that each leg forms a nominal right-angle with the torso. The right-angle causes the body to have a notable "L" shape, hence the name "L-sit". It requires significant abdominal strength.

When executing an L-sit, a variety of supports may be used by the performer, including gymnastics apparatus such as the floor, rings, parallel bars or parallettes, or the hands of an adagio partner.

The performer's legs may be held together in front of the body or, in a variant called the straddled L-sit, the legs may be separated so that they straddle the arms.

== Similar positions ==
The V-sit is similar to the L-sit except that the legs are raised further, so that the feet are held above the hips. In the even more difficult manna, the legs continue to rotate up and back until the torso is raised and the hips are held above the shoulders.

The L-sit Cross is a variant of L-sit with the arms extended laterally. It is a variant of the iron cross and is common in rings routines.

Variants and similar positions
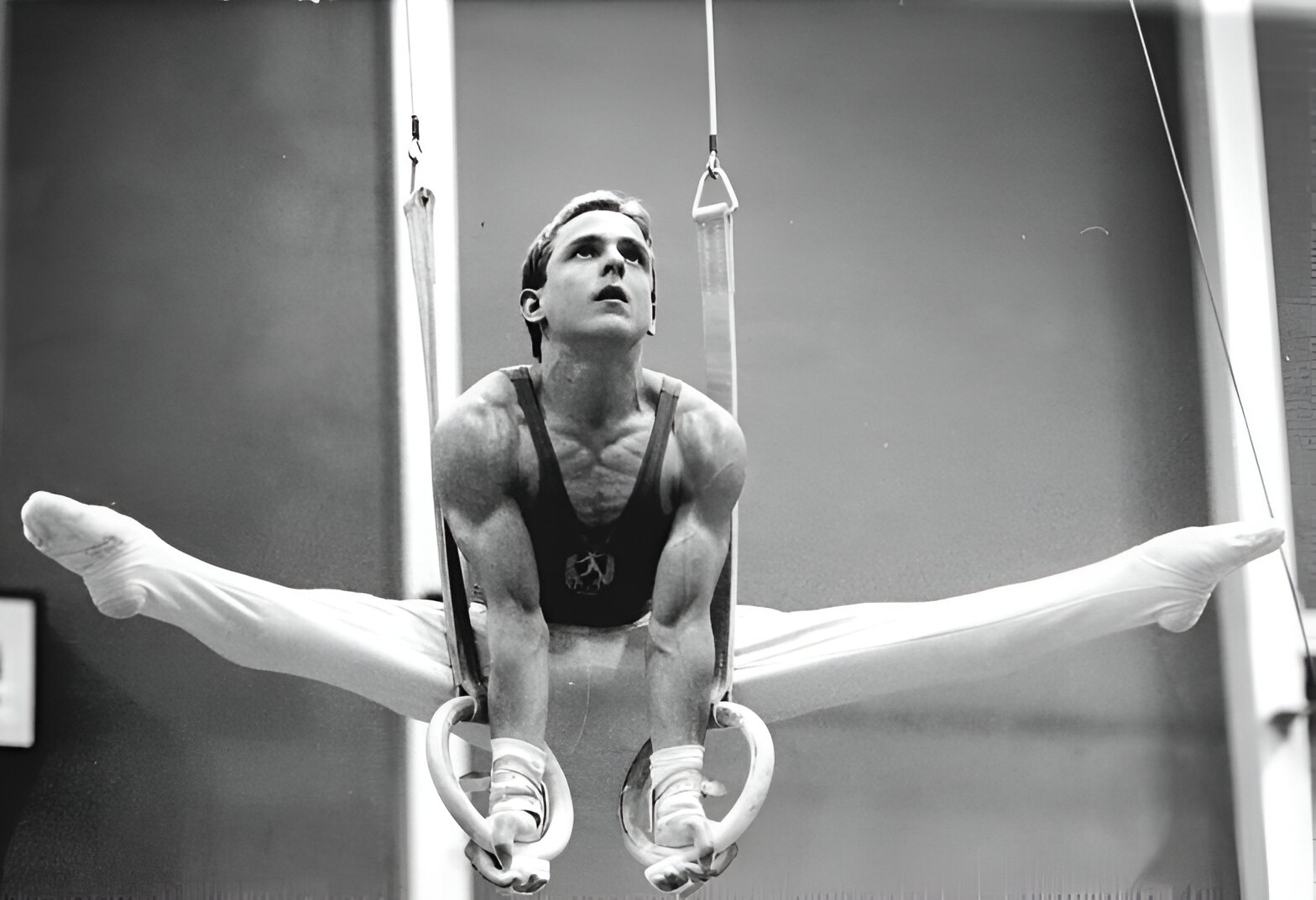
Straddled L-sit on rings

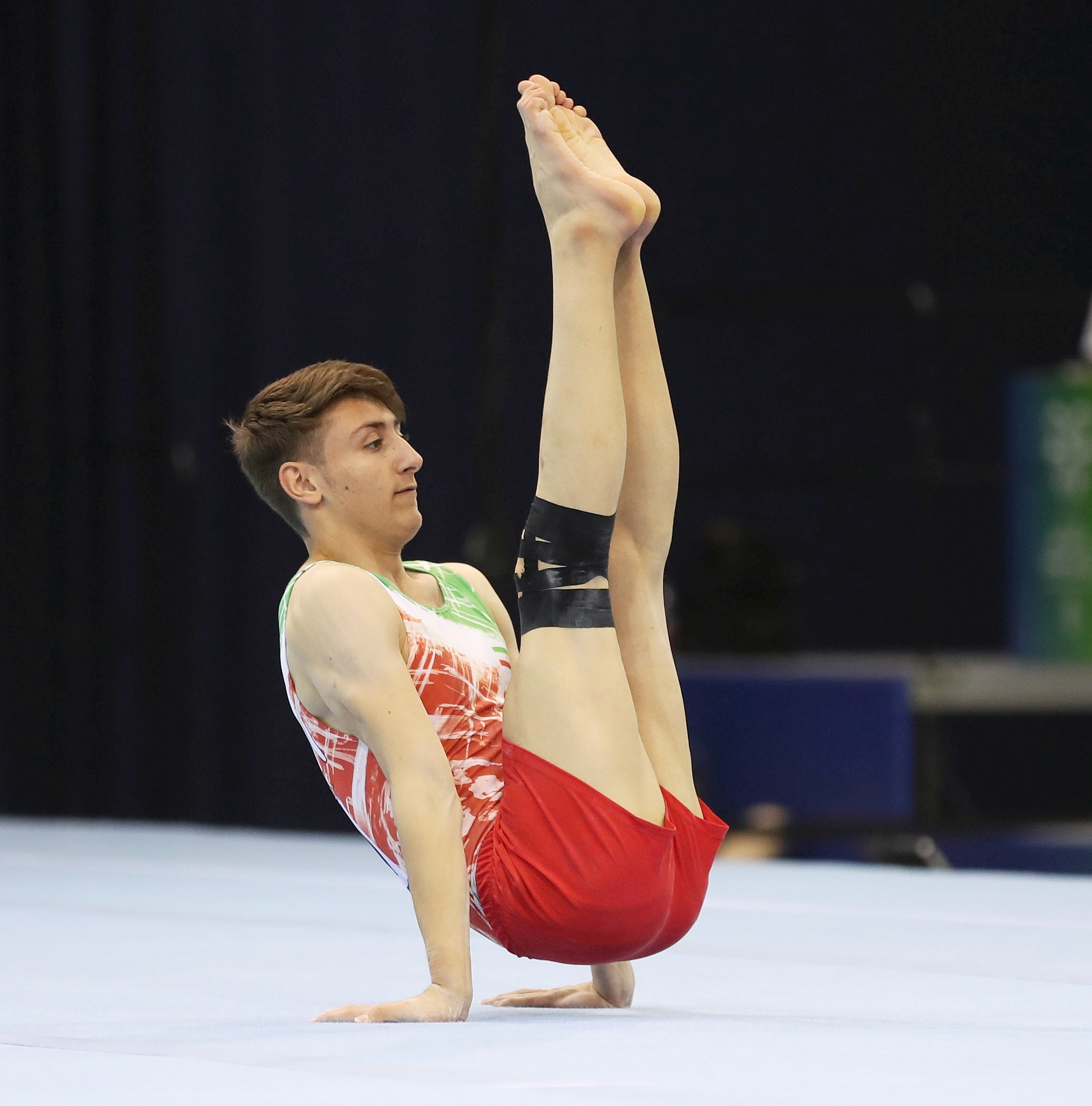
V-sit on floor

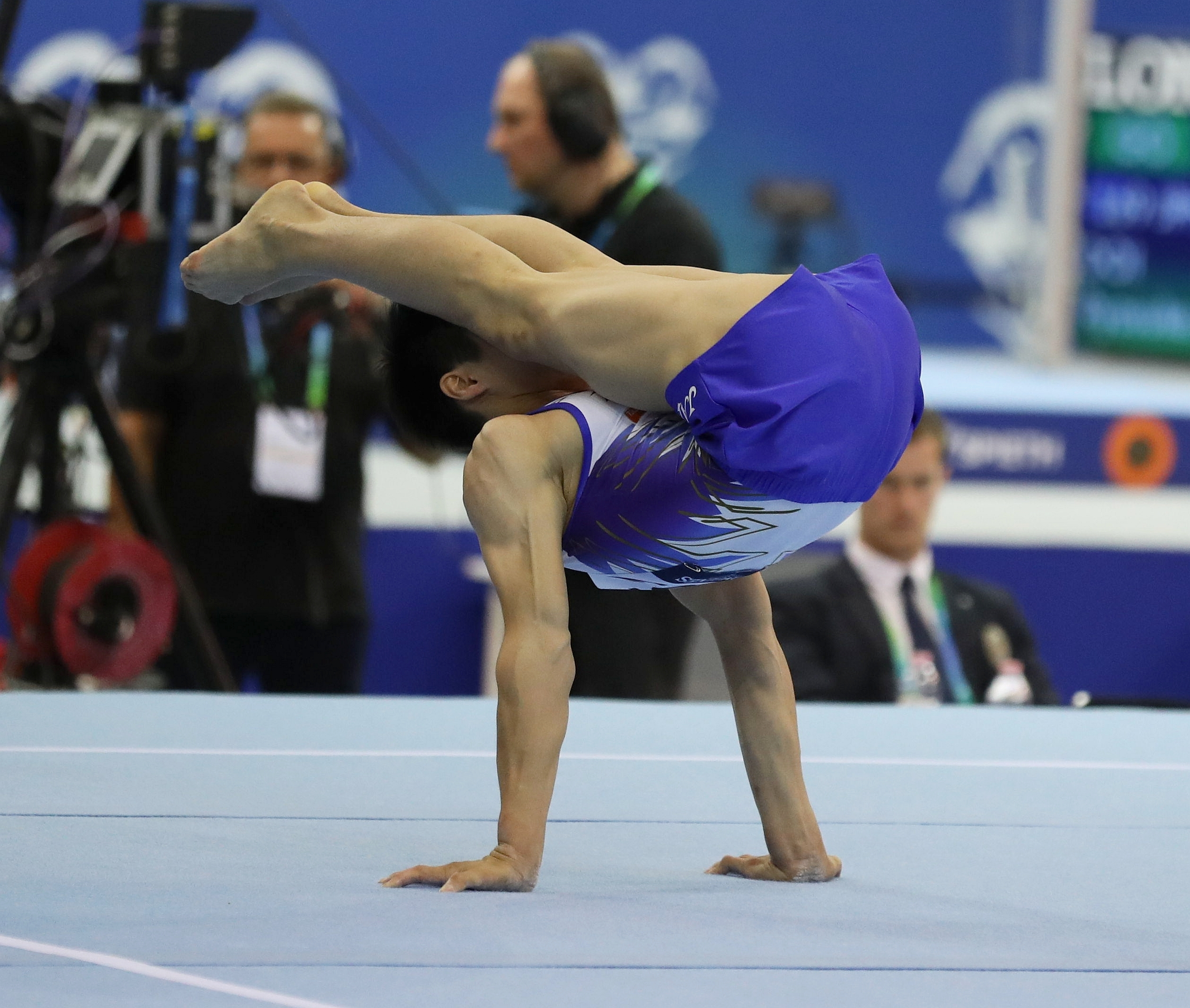
Manna on floor
