= Squat thrust =

Calisthenic exercise

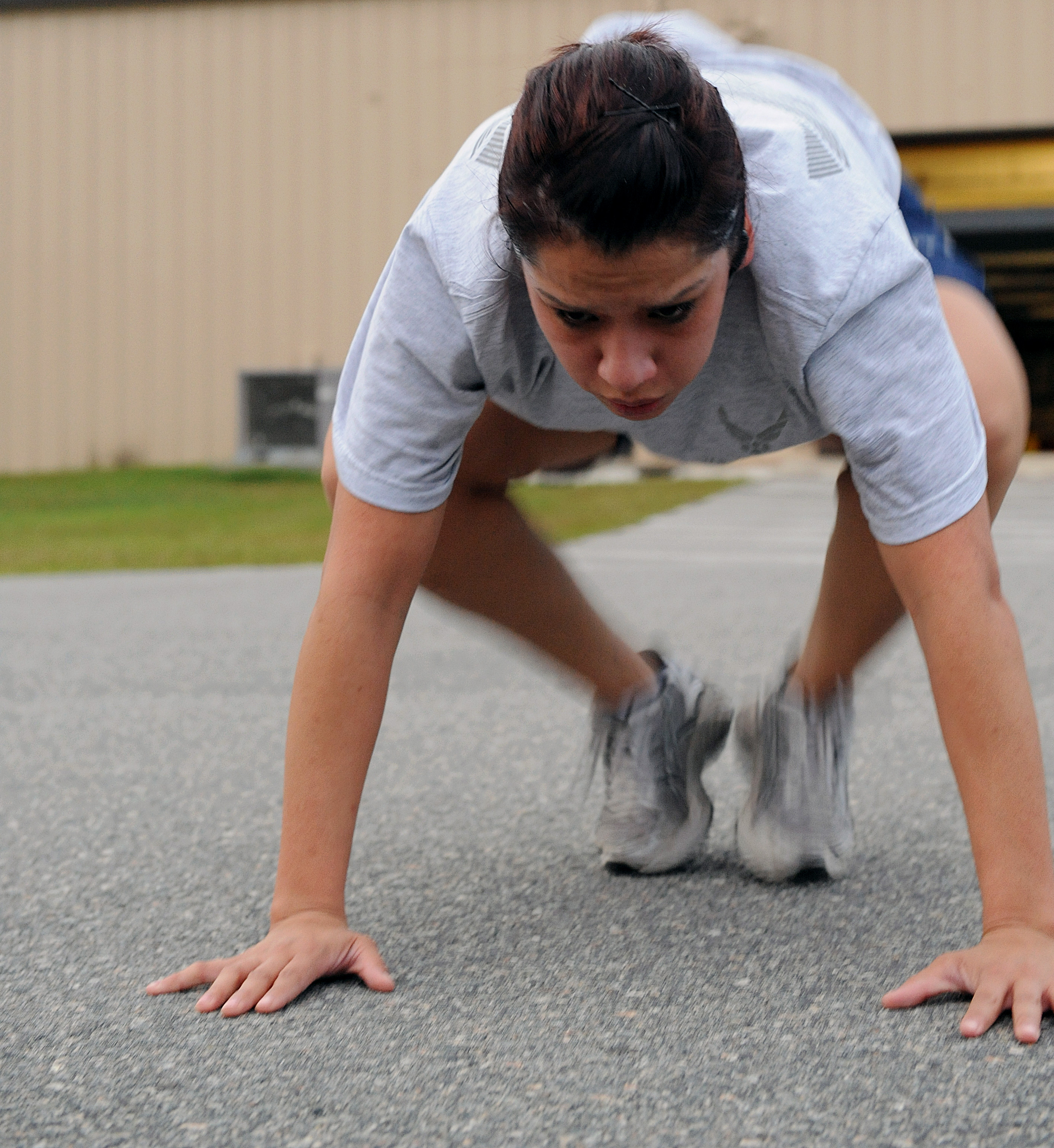
Staff Sgt. Christina Kaun performs a squat thrust exercise at Moody Air Force Base in 2009.

The squat thrust or up down is a calisthenic exercise. It is typically performed as follows:

1. Bend your knees and drop into a squat position, then fall forward, placing your hands on the ground, into the push-up position.
2. Throwing your feet back, fall forward into a push-up position.
3. Again pull the feet forward to a squat position with hands on the floor.

A variation is the alternate leg or split-squat thrusts. This is performed by starting in the same position as the normal squat thrust and then splitting the legs in motion; keeping on your toes during the exercise, take one leg from the rear, up towards the chest in a smooth motion, once the foot of this leg reaches the ground, the other leg should then start to come up towards the chest, and at the same time the leading leg should go back to the starting position.

== See also ==
- Burpee
