= Dip (exercise) =

Upper-body strength exercise

Dip exercise using a dip bar

A dip is an upper-body strength exercise. Close grip dips primarily train the triceps, with major synergists being the anterior deltoid, the pectoralis muscles, and the rhomboid muscles of the back. Wide shoulder width dips place additional emphasis on the pectoral muscles, similar in respect to the way a wide grip bench press would focus more on the pectorals and less on the triceps.

== Modern meaning ==
To perform a dip, the exerciser supports themselves on a dip bar with their arms straight down and shoulders over their hands, then lowers their body until their arms are bent to a 90-degree angle at the elbows, and then lifts their body up, returning to the starting position.

== Variation ==
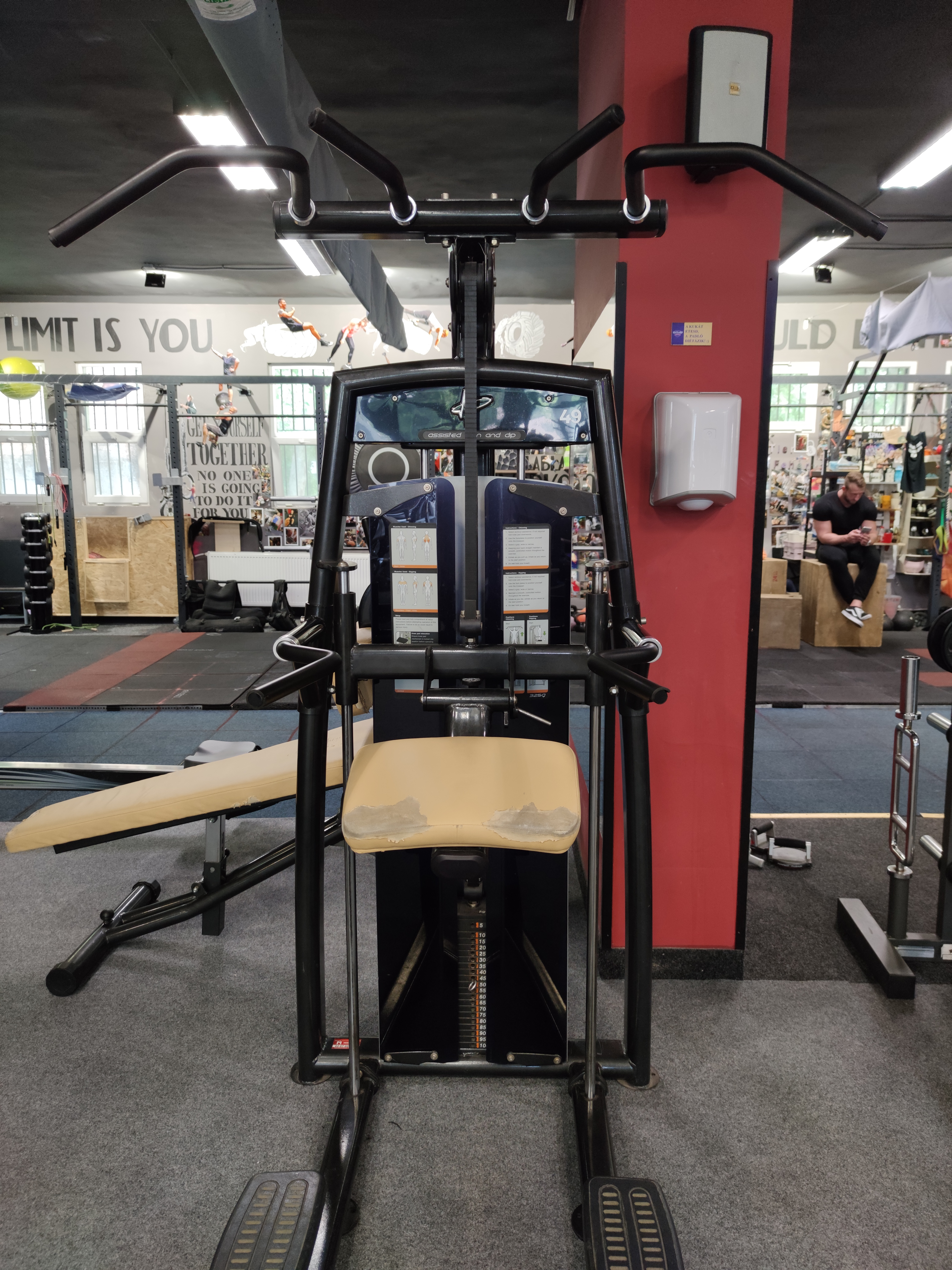
Combined dip and pull-up machine with weights

Usually dips are done on a dip bar, with the exerciser's hands supporting their entire body weight. For added resistance, weights can be added by use of a dip belt, weighted vest, or by wearing a backpack with weights in it. A dumbbell may also be held between the knees or ankles. For less resistance, an assisted dip/pull-up machine can be used which reduces the force necessary for the exerciser to elevate their body by use of a counterweight. One may also use resistance bands hooked under their feet to help if they lack the strength to properly perform a dip.

Another variation of the dip is done on gymnastic rings. Similar to a bar dip, the exerciser's hands grasp the rings, supporting their entire bodyweight. The unsteady nature of the rings adds additional challenge, although there are variations to make the exercise easier.

In the absence of equipment, a lighter variation of the dip can be performed called the "Bench Dip". The hands are placed on one bench directly underneath the shoulders or on two parallel benches.

Name	Description	
Standard	Sometimes called "parallel bar dip"	Standard "Parallel Bar" Dip
Weighted	To progressively overload for strength and/or hypertrophy gains, external load can be added via a dip belt, weight vest, or other means.	Weighted Dip
Straight Bar	The top of half of the muscle up performed on a straight bar. This variation involves a more pronounced forward lean as well as hip flexion (raising the legs up and forward) to maintain the center of gravity and maneuver around the bar. This is usually executed with a pronated (overhand) grip but can also be done supinated (underhand).	
Korean	Also performed on a single straight bar but with the bar behind the body. It is a highly advanced variation performed by elite calisthenics athletes and gymnasts.	
Russian	A variation where the forearms are lowered until parallel to/resting on the bar after the standard eccentric phase. This increases elbow extension demand to activate and stimulate the triceps brachii.	

== See also ==
- A muscle-up is a pull-up that transitions into a dip, whether on a horizontal bar or rings.
- An iron cross in which the body is suspended upright while the arms are extended laterally, forming the shape of the Christian cross.
- Pull-up (exercise)
