= Weighted vests for children =

Therapeutic clothing

Weighted vests for children and similar therapeutic weighted clothing are sometimes used to try to treat symptoms of certain developmental disorders such as attention deficit hyperactivity disorder or autism in children. There is however no evidence that they are useful for this purpose.

The vests are weighted down with sand or other heavy materials. Terms used for such items of clothing include sand vests, compression vests or squeeze jackets.

== Effectiveness ==
A review of the use of weighted clothing indicates that they are not useful with respect to hyperactivity, clumsiness, or repetitive behavior. A 2015 review of treatments for autism found only a single study of five people that showed any benefit and six trials that showed no benefit resulting in the overall conclusion of no benefit. The use of weighted vests for autism is characterized as pseudoscience.

== Application ==
The use of weighted vests for children originated in the United States as a form of therapy for children with autism. By 2017, the use of weighted vests had become common in public schools in Hamburg, Germany. Teachers there reported that students wore the vests voluntarily for up to 30 minutes at a time, and that the vests were popular with the children. Media reports about this practice triggered controversy and criticism because of the lack of long-term studies of the effect of wearing such vests.

== See also ==
- Weighted blanket
