= Iron cross (gymnastics) =

Gymnastics skill

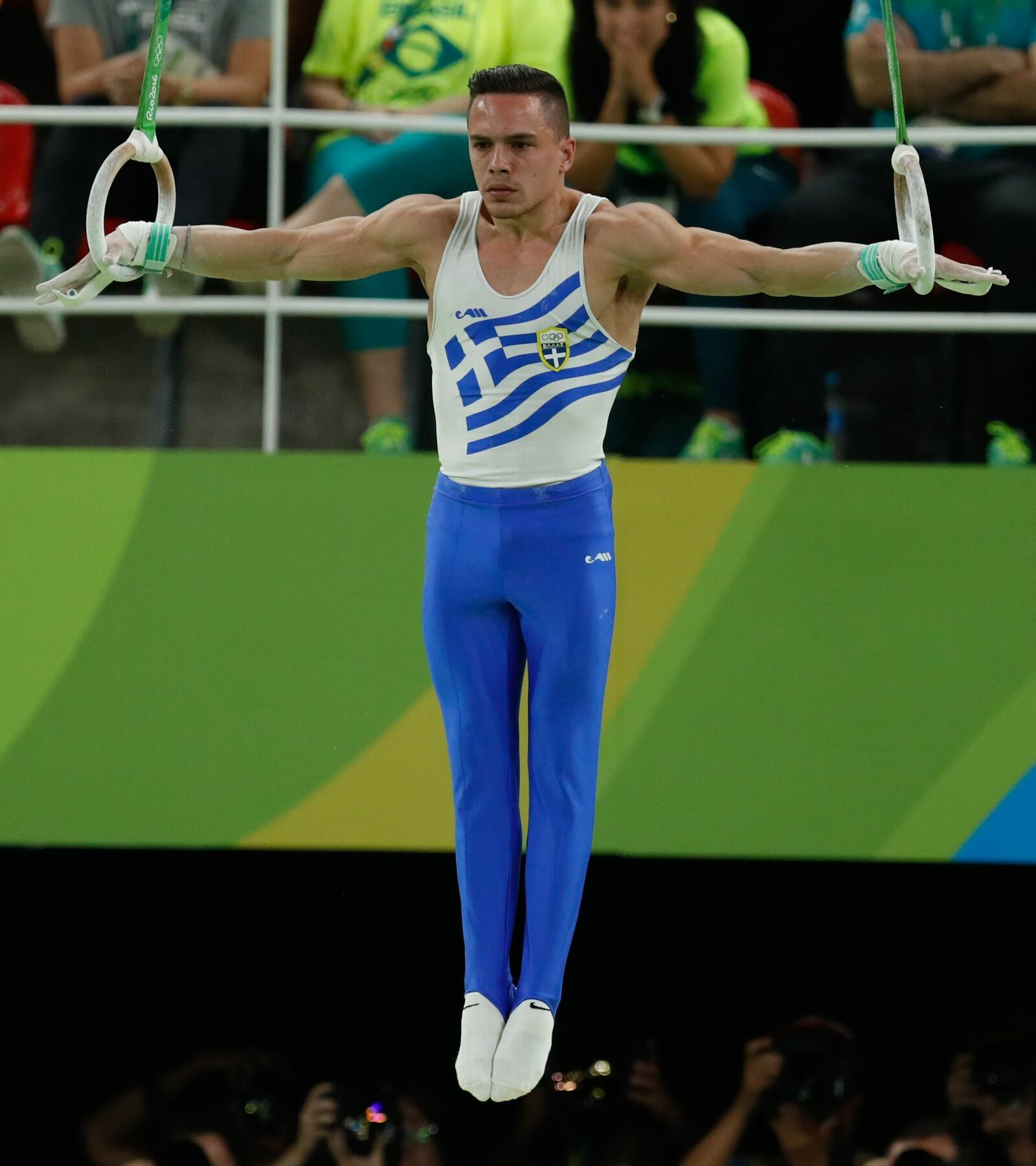
Eleftherios Petrounias performs an iron cross during his gold medal routine at the 2016 Olympics

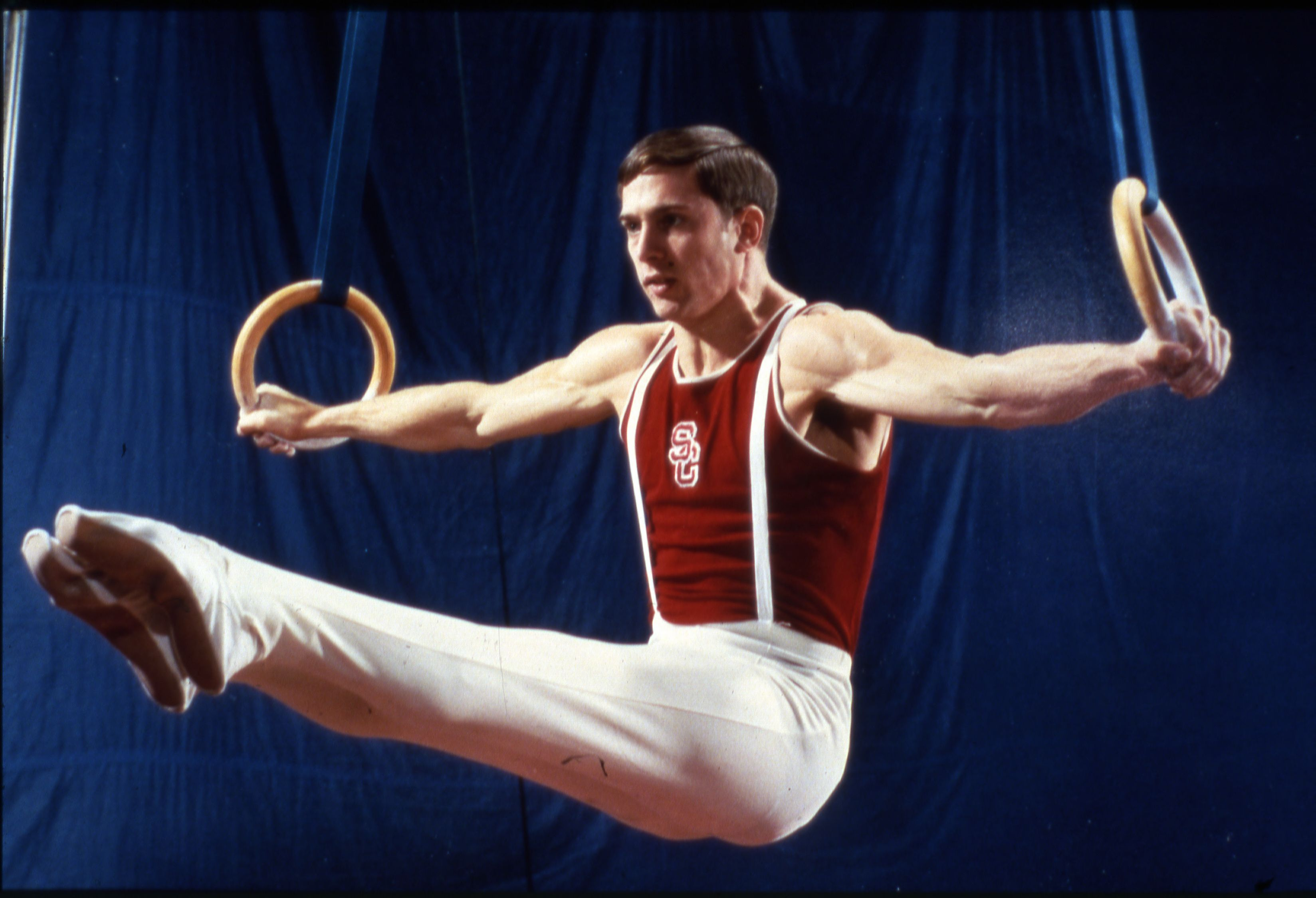
L cross

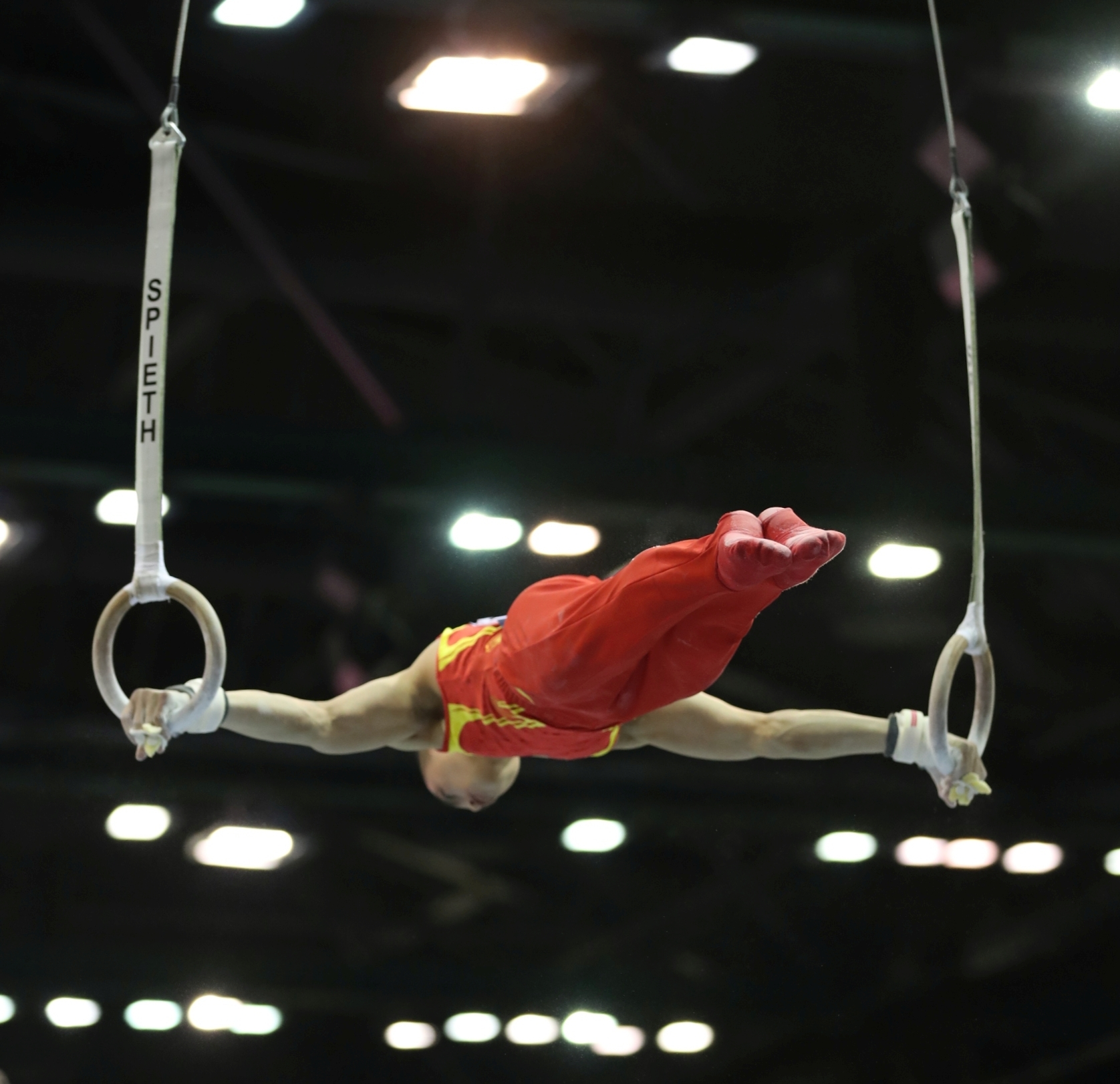
Maltese cross

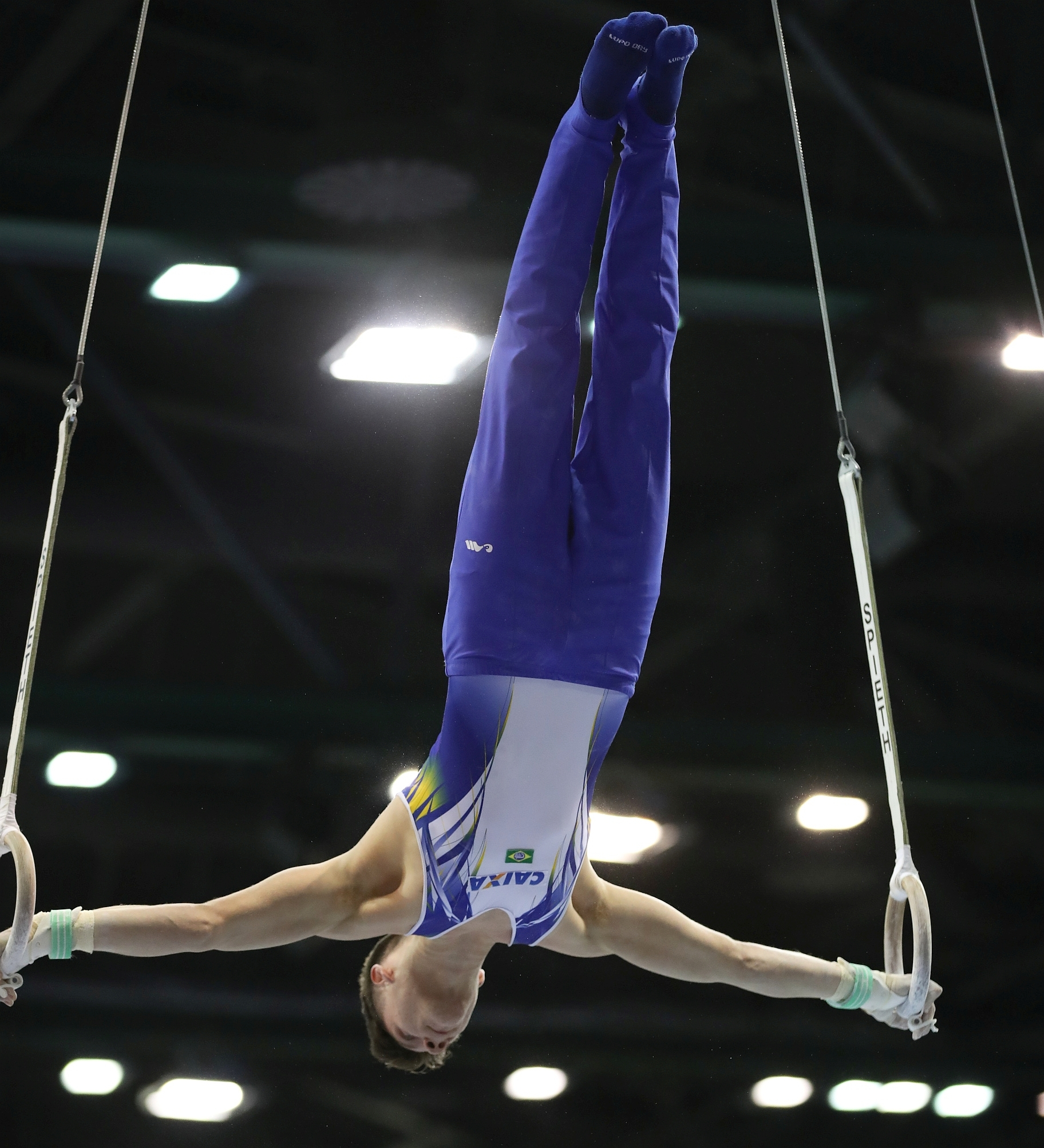
Inverted cross

An iron cross, also known as a crucifix or cross, is a gymnastics skill on the rings in which the body is suspended upright while the arms are extended laterally, forming the shape of the Christian cross. It is a move that requires significant shoulder and biceps tendon strength.

The International Gymnastics Federation Code of Points refers to the skill as a cross and lists it as a "B" difficulty value strength hold element.

== Variants ==
Variations of the iron cross listed in the FIG Code of Points include:

- Azaryan cross: which incorporates a quarter turn to the side.
- L cross (B difficulty): the cross is performed with the body held in an L-sit position.
- V cross (C difficulty): the cross is performed with the body in a tight piked position and the legs held vertically.
- Inverted cross (C difficulty): the cross is performed in an inverted (upside down) position.
- Maltese cross or swallow (D difficulty): the gymnast holds his body parallel to the ground at ring height with arms extended laterally.
- Victorian cross or inverted swallow (E difficulty): an inverted Maltese cross, with the body held parallel to the ground and facing up.

== See also ==
- Calisthenics
