= Muscle-up =

Bodyweight exercise

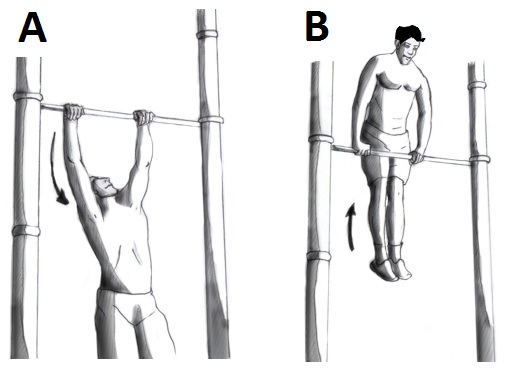
Diagram of muscle up steps

A man performing a muscle-up

The muscle-up (also known as a muscleup or muscle up) is an intermediate strength training exercise within the domain of calisthenics. It is a combination routine of a radial pull-up followed by a dip. Variations exist for the rings as well as the bar.

== Form ==
The muscle-up begins with the arms extended above the head, gripping a hold in the overhand pull-up position. The hold is usually on a chin-up bar or gymnastic rings.

The body is then explosively pulled up by the arms in a radial pull-up, with greater speed than a regular pull-up. When the bar approaches the upper chest, the wrists are swiftly flexed to bring the forearms above the bar. The body is leaned forward, and the elbows are straightened by activating the triceps. The routine is considered complete when the bar is at the level of the waist and the arms are fully straight.

To dismount, the arms are bent at the elbow, as in a dip, and the body is lowered to the floor, and the exercise can be repeated.

As a relatively advanced exercise, muscle-ups are typically first learned with an assistive kip. The legs swing (kip) up and provide momentum to assist in the explosive upward force needed to ascend above the bar. More advanced athletes can perform a strict variation of the muscle-up which is done slowly, without any kip. This variation begins with a swinging dead hang (or by standing still, with feet further forward than the bar, if the person's feet can touch the ground) and uses muscle contraction to ascend above the bar in an explosive yet controlled fashion.

== Grip and wrist position ==
A closed pull-up grip involves the thumb on the opposite side of the bar from the rest of the fingers. When rings are used, an advanced position known as the "false grip" must be performed in order to transition smoothly from the pull-up to the dip.

== Muscles targeted ==
True to its name, the muscle-up targets a large number of muscle groupings in the back, shoulders, arms, and core. Major pull-up power comes from the latissimus dorsi muscle of the back and the biceps. The entire core is also engaged throughout this movement in order to stabilize the transition. Once over the bar, the triceps provide the bulk of the power for the final dipping motion. Upper chest and lower chest also becomes engaged as it provides significant amount of pressure once an athlete gets on top of the bar/ring.

== World records ==
- Most consecutive bar muscle ups: 56 by Max True (Germany) 2025.
- Most consecutive ring muscle ups: 21 by Love Andersson (Norway) 2022.

== See also ==
- Pull-up (exercise)
- Pull-up bar
