= Pull-up =

Upper-body compound pulling exercise

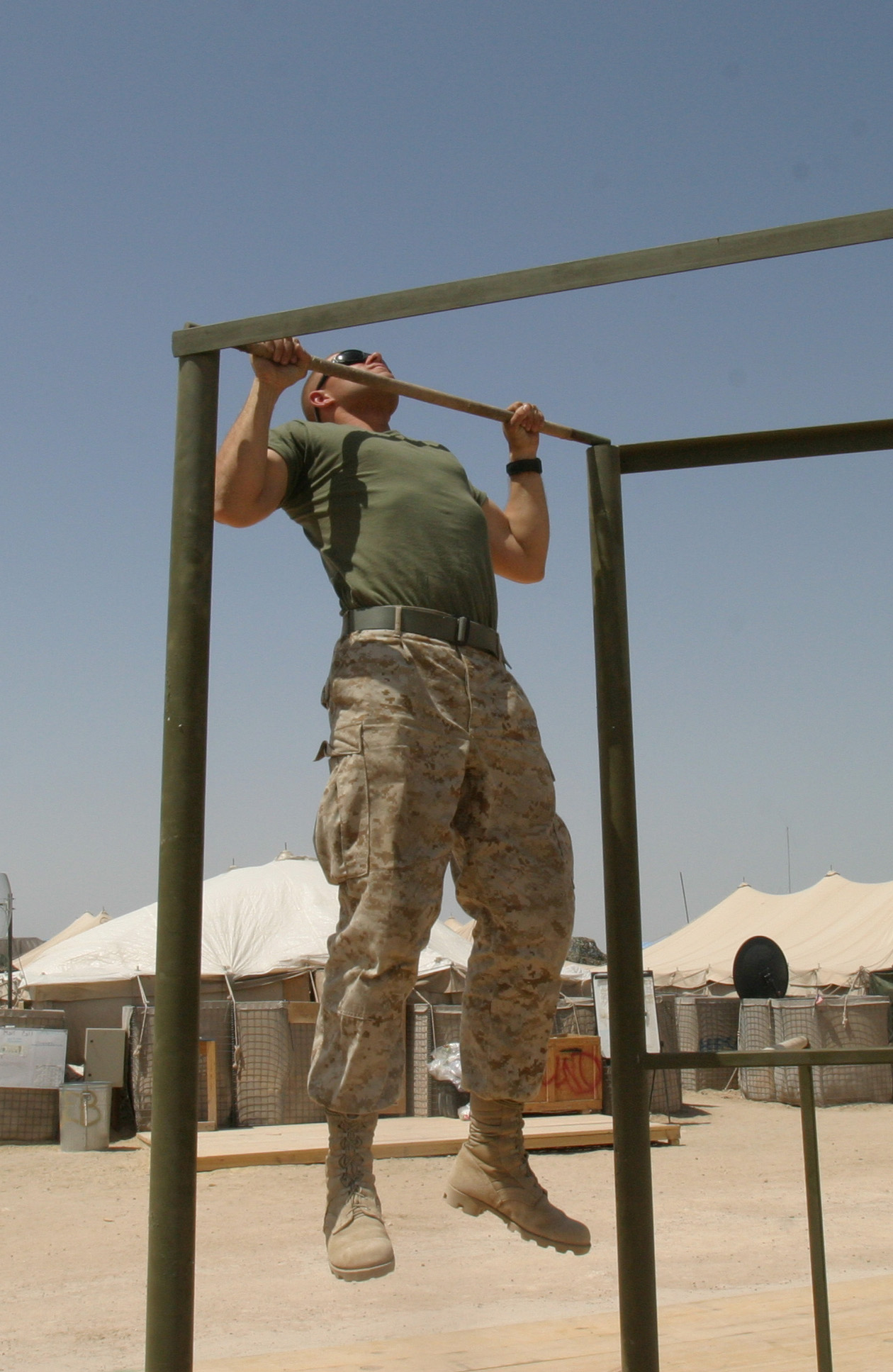
A U.S. marine performing a pull-up

A pull-up is an upper-body strength exercise. The pull-up is a closed-chain movement where the body is suspended by the hands, gripping a bar or other implement at a distance typically wider than shoulder-width, and pulled up. As this happens, the elbows flex and the shoulders adduct and extend to bring the elbows to the torso.

Pull-ups build up several muscles of the upper body, including the latissimus dorsi, trapezius, and biceps brachii. A pull-up may be performed with overhand (pronated), underhand (supinated)—sometimes referred to as a chin-up—neutral, or rotating hand position.

Pull-ups are used by some organizations as a component of fitness tests, and as a conditioning activity for some sports.

== Movement ==
Beginning by hanging from the bar, the body is pulled up vertically. From the top position, the participant lowers their body until the arms and shoulders are fully extended. The end range of motion at the top end may be chin over bar or higher, such as chest to bar.

Pull-ups are a closed-chain, compound movement involving flexion at the elbow and adduction or extension of the shoulder joint. The trapezius, infraspinatus, and brachialis muscles are most active at the beginning of the pull-up; the latissimus dorsi, teres major, and biceps brachii reach peak activity during the middle of the movement, and the triceps brachii and subscapularis experienced maximum activity at the top of the movement. There is similarity to the pull-down in terms of the muscle activation.

A 2017 study found that pronated grip activated the middle trapezius more than the neutral grip, but that overall the muscle activation of different grip variants was similar. Muscle activation is significantly different depending on whether the pull-up is completed individually or in a set without resting between repetitions, which is more efficient due to muscle and tendon stretch-shortening rebound.

Overhead movements such as pull-ups reduce the subacromial space and create a risk of shoulder impingement. According to one study, the pronated grip pull-up with hands at shoulder width apart led to less risk of impingement than other variations studied.

== Variations ==
Pull-ups can be done with a supinated, neutral, or pronated grip; devices allow the grip to rotate during the pull-up. The pull-up performed with a supinated grip is sometimes called a chin-up. A pull-up may be completed using different widths of hand position; studies have found that participants freely choose a grip that is between 20 and 50 percent wider than shoulder width. A grip that is too wide could increase the injury risk or reduce the number of repetitions able to be completed due to lengthening the lever arm.

Name	Description	Picture
Standard		A standard pull-up
Weighted	To increase the difficulty, weights are added using a dip belt, weight vest, or other means.	Animation of a weighted pull-up
One arm	A one arm pull-up is performed by using only one arm to lift the body; another variation is using only one finger.	Animation of a one arm pull-up
Kipping	An easier version in which momentum is built by adding a glide kip swing. Kipping pull-ups have lower muscle activation in the upper body but greater activation in the lower body and core; it is possible to perform them faster and complete more repetitions before encountering upper-body fatigue. Kipping pull-ups are considered high risk for injury and are a major cause of shoulder injury in CrossFit athletes.	
Mixed grip	A pull-up performed with the hands facing opposite directions, one in pronation (overhand) and one in supination (underhand). When performed with a higher pull so that the chest reaches the bar, it is often referred to as a chest-to-bar pull-up.	Chest-to-bar pull-ups at the 2008 CrossFit Games
Muscle-up	A pull-up that transitions to a dip; it is more difficult than a pull-up and requires significant strength and technique to execute. Originating in gymnastics, it is also popular in CrossFit where it may be performed with kipping.	Animation of a muscle-up
Assisted	The effective weight of the participant is reduced by such means as resistance band, counterweight, or resting the feet on a surface to make the exercise easier. Assisted pull-ups can be used to increase pulling strength among those who cannot do an unassisted pull-up.	Machine
Eccentric	Beginning from the top position of the pull-up, the participant gradually lowers themselves into the dead hang position. This can be used as a progression to performing a standard pull-up.	

== Equipment ==
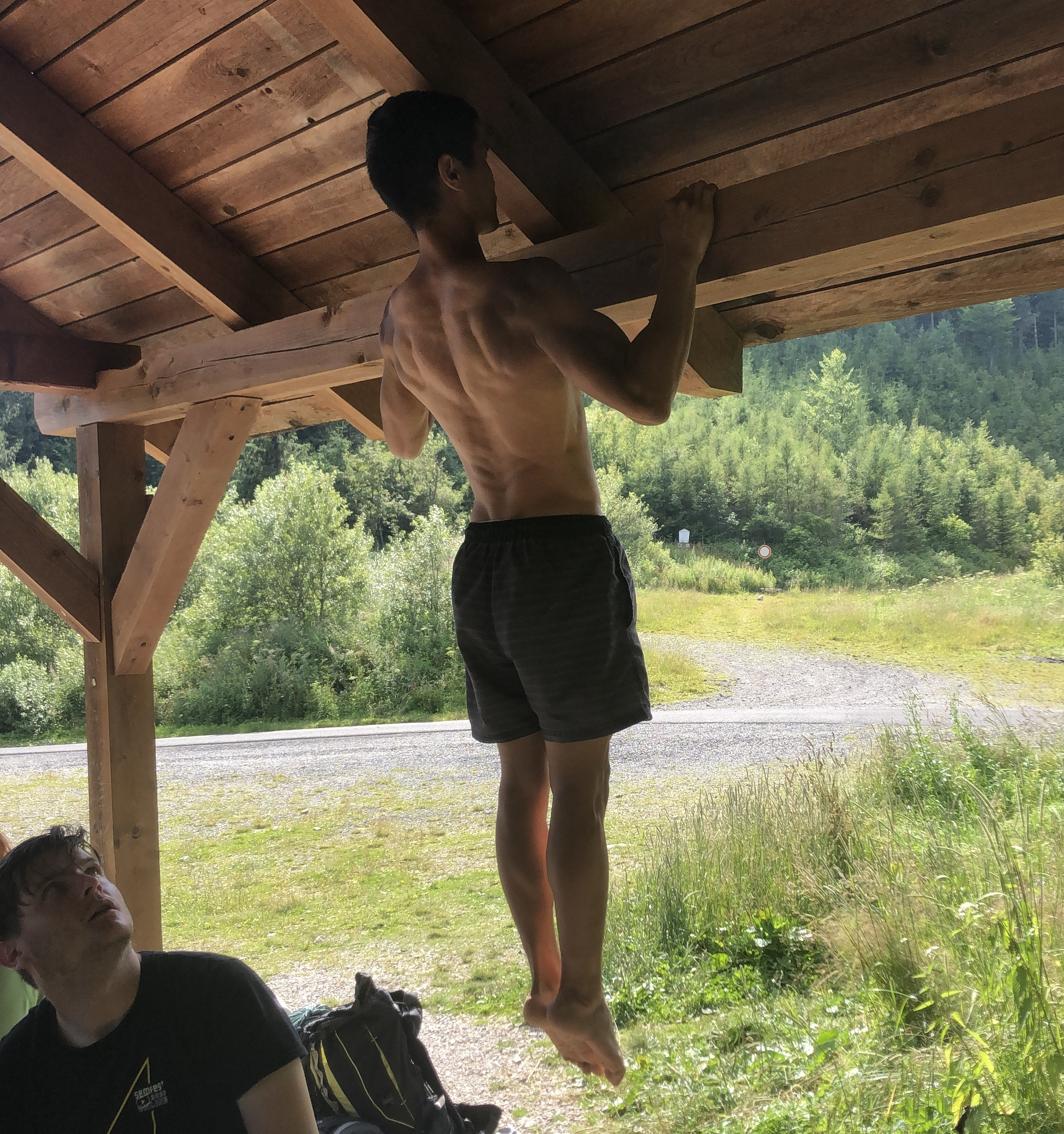
Performing a pull-up using a joist

Pull-ups are commonly performed using a bar; doorway mounted bars are sold for use in in-home gyms. They can also be completed by grasping towels, rotating handles or gymnastics rings.

== Use ==
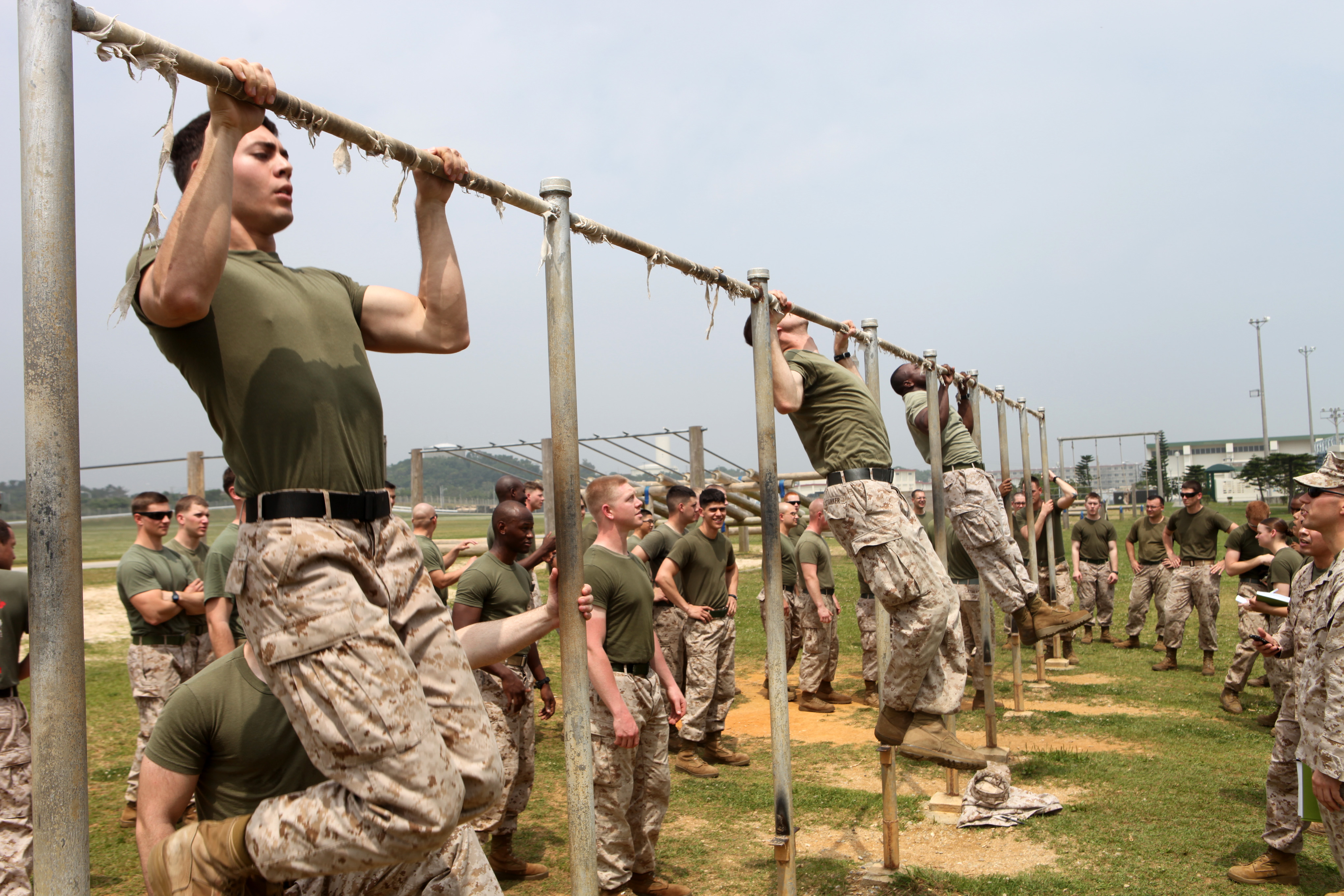
31st Marine Expeditionary Unit members in a team pull-up competition.

Pull-ups are a common way to measure upper body strength, endurance, and strength-to-weight ratio. The strength to do a pull-up is correlated with job-related tasks in some careers such as firefighting, police, and military.

Pull-ups are used as a conditioning activity for many sports, especially those that require pulling strength, including rock climbing, gymnastics, rope climbing, rowing, and swimming. They are also used by police and military to increase muscular strength among their members.

Some organizations have allowed women to use a flexed arm hang as a substitute for a pull up in fitness tests after discovering that few female recruits could complete a pull-up. According to a 2003 study in college-age women, one third of participants were able to complete a pull-up after a twelve-week full-body strength training program.

== Guinness World Records ==
The Guinness World Record for the most consecutive pull-ups was set by Japan Coast Guard diver Kenta Adachi in 2022 with 651 pull-ups, taking 87 minutes. In 2024 he improved his record to 1224 pull-ups. The rule was that one pull-up has to be done every 15 seconds. The world record for pull-ups with no breaks is 88, held by Joonas Mäkipelto. The heaviest weighted pull up is 146.64 kg and was achieved by Liu Weiqiang from China in Zhangjiakou, Hebei, China, on 1 February 2025. The Guinness World Record for longest dead hang on a pull-up bar by a woman over age 80 was surpassed by over a minute in 2026 when Bonnie Sumner hung for more than 3 minutes. The Guinness World Record for the most pull ups in 24 hours (male) was set by Enrique Zapata from Mexico in 2026 with 12,345 pull ups. The Guinness World Record for the most pull ups in 24 hours (female) was set by Olivia Vinson from Australia in 2025 with 7,079 pull ups.

== See also ==
- List of calisthenics exercises
