= Handstand push-up =

Type of push-up exercise

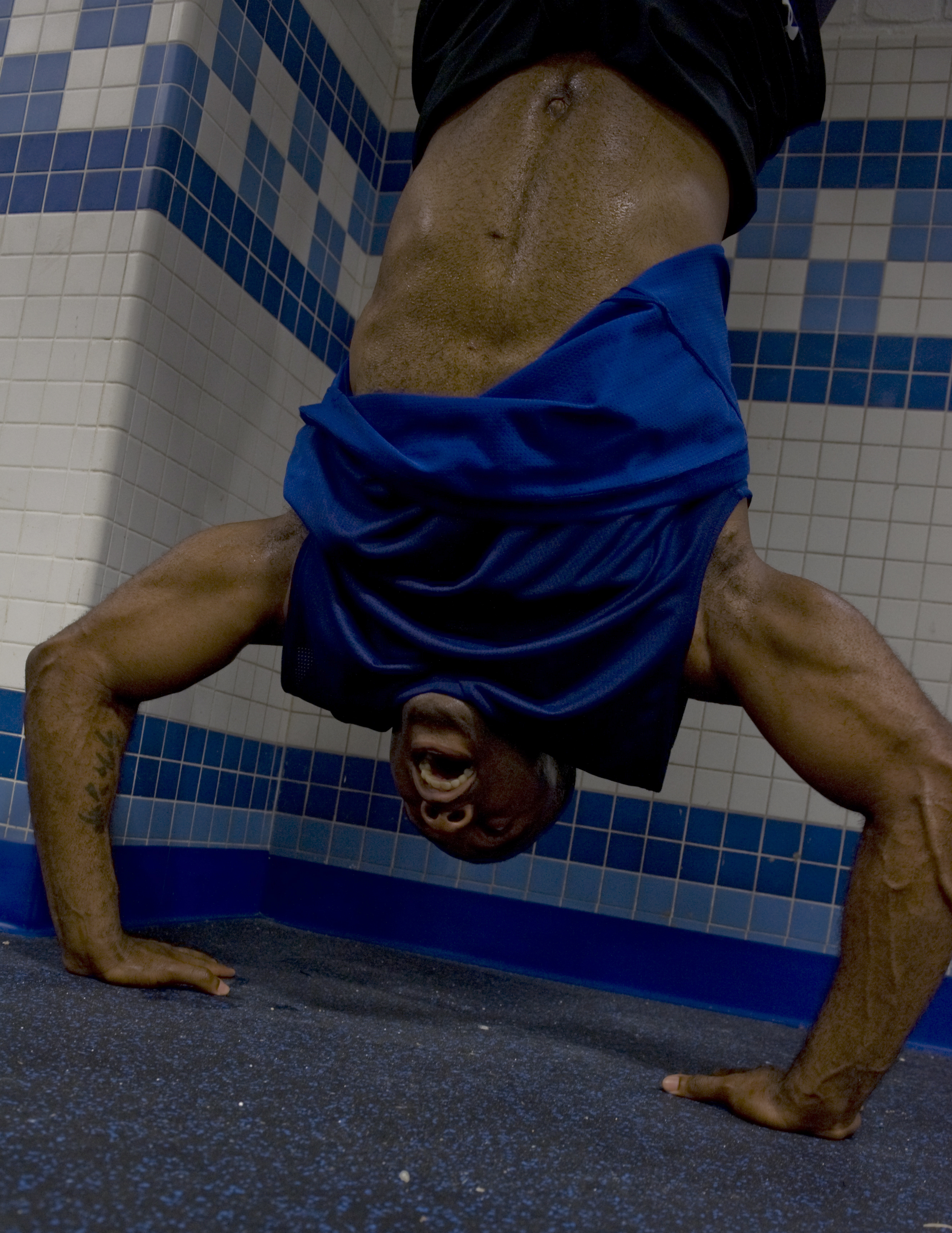
The body is vertical in a handstand

The handstand push-up (press-up) - also called the vertical push-up (press-up) or the inverted push-up (press-up), also called "commandos" - is a type of push-up exercise where the body is positioned in a handstand. For a true handstand, the exercise is performed free-standing, held in the air. The Handstand Push Up (HSPU) is an advanced bodyweight exercise that is highly effective for hypertrophy and explosive strength, particularly in the shoulders, arms, and triceps. To prepare the strength until one has built adequate balance, the feet are often placed against a wall, held by a partner, or secured in some other way from falling. Handstand pushups require significant strength, as well as balance and control if performed free-standing.

== Similar exercises ==
The movement can be considered a bodyweight exercise similar to the military press, while the regular push-up is similar to the bench press.

== Muscles ==
The primary muscles used in the handstand push-up are the anterior deltoid, middle deltoid, posterior deltoid, pectoralis major, upper trapezius, and triceps brachii.

== Ability ==
The handstand push-up is measured in the Men's Gymnastics Functional Measurement Tool (MGFMT). According to one test on competitive male gymnasts in the United States, those competing at Level 4 averaged 3.0 handstand push-ups while those at Level 10 averaged 15.7.
