= Weighted clothing =

Type of clothing

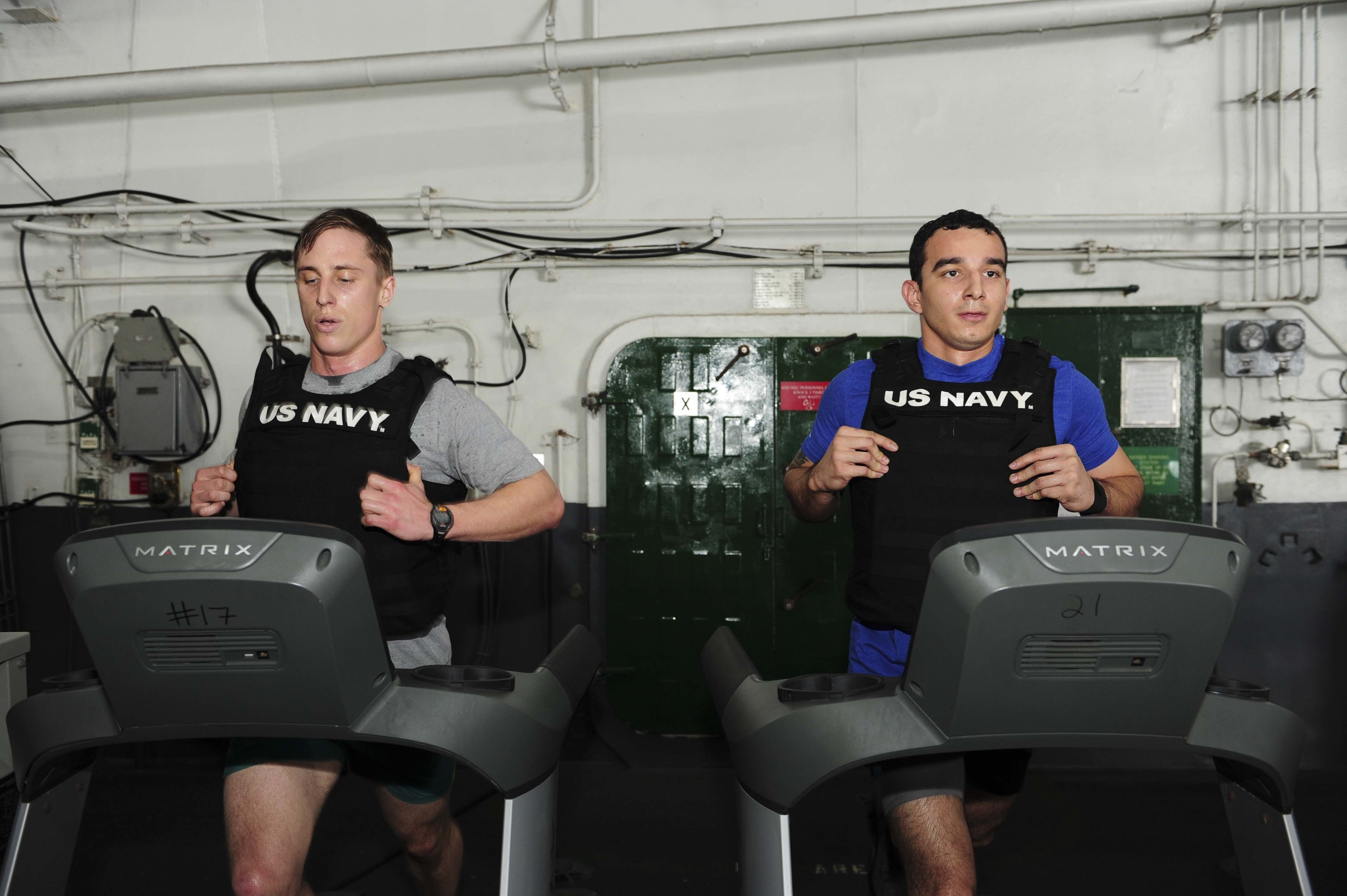
Two men run on treadmills while wearing 10 kg (20 lbs) weighted vests.

Weighted clothing are garments that have heavy materials incorporated into them, to add weight to various parts of the body, usually as part of resistance training. The effect is achieved through attaching weighted pieces to the body (or to other garments) which leave the hands free to grasp objects. Unlike with held weights or machines, weighted clothing can leave users more able to do a variety of movements and manual labour. In some cases certain weighted clothing can be worn under normal clothing, to disguise its use to allow exercise in casual environments.

The use of weighted clothing is a form of resistance training, generally a kind of weight training. In addition to the greater effect of gravity on the person, it also adds resistance during ballistic movements, due to more force needed to overcome the inertia of heavier masses, as well as a greater momentum that needs deceleration at the end of the movement to avoid injury. The method may increase muscle mass or lose weight; however, there have been concerns about the safety of some uses of weights, such as wrist and ankle weights.

It is normally done in the form of small weights, attached to increase endurance when performed in long repetitive events, such as running, swimming, punching, kicking or jumping. Heavier weighted clothing can also be used for slow, controlled movements, and as a way to add resistance to body-weight exercises.

== Core ==
=== Neck ===
Sometimes, weights are draped over or tied to the neck. As weighted vests often have weight placed here, they effectively have the same benefits. Advantages to neck weights and more upper-body-centric weighted vests is that they allow easier spinal flexion (contracting abdominals or stretching extensor spinae) and extension (contracting extensor spinae, stretching abdominals). This makes them prime for adding resistance to these movements, and takes out the requirement of using the arms to anchor weight to the upper body to add resistance.

=== Torso ===
==== Vests ====
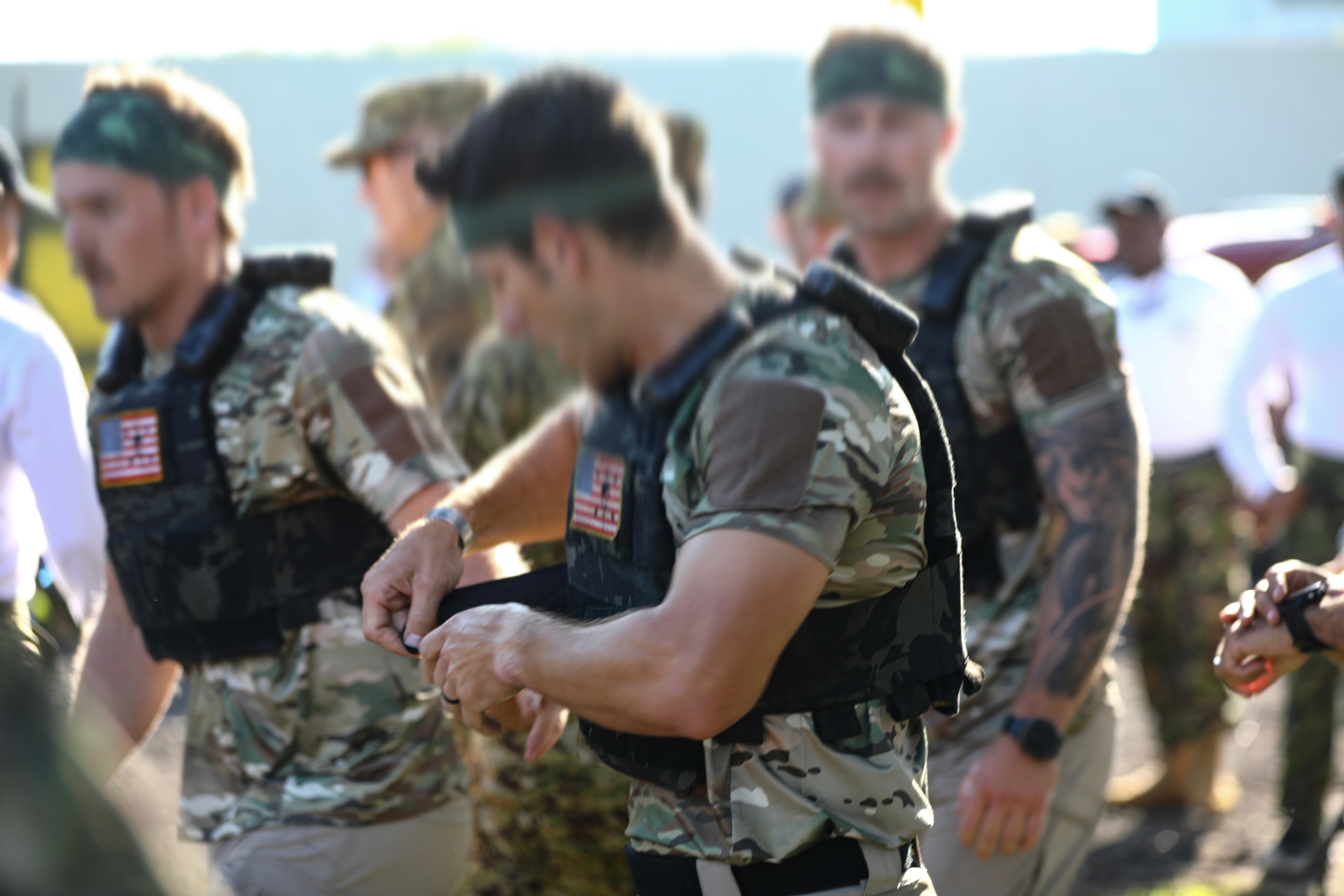
U.S. Army Special Operation Team members don weighted vests.

The purpose of using a weight vest is to add extra weight for body-weight exercises and to create an overload effect for walking, distance running or speed, agility and quickness (SAQ) drills. Research demonstrates that using an overload during sprinting or speed drills requires lower-body muscles to generate more force against the ground which could lead to gains in strength and power and ultimately faster acceleration during running. They are used by athletes to increase strength and efficiency during speed, power and agility drills; producing a unique training effect that is unavailable with traditional free weight training equipment. They can also be used by casual walkers or runners.

Weight vests are becoming a very popular form of adding weight around the entire core to, for the most part, simulate the fat storage areas of the human body. It is very useful for adding weight to limb-centric movements, and for handling great weights. Due to the large area available, it can also handle more weight. If well-affixed, it is the safest most natural means of mimicking added body mass without unbalancing the body's muscles. They can be used to add resistance to almost any whole-body movement. A study has shown that using a weighted vest can increase the metabolic costs, relative exercise intensity, and loading of the skeletal system during walking.

One problem with some weighted vests is that due to tightness in the shoulder girdle, in movements like pull-ups or high range of motion pushups, the vest can be shearing, either damaging the person or in some cases, the vest itself being slowly torn away. This can also be seen as an advantage, however, in those who wish to limit their range of motion due to lack of strength or flexibility, to avoid injury. The limitations of front and back bending of the core is for example, contrasted by ergonomic construction to encourage good posture in modern weighted vests such as the x-vest, hyper vest or game-breakers pro suit.

Another problem is the constriction of breathing and overheating due to the use of heavy, non-breathing materials such as nylon and neoprene. The latest developments in weighted vest products offer comfortable weight vests with cool wicking fabric that allow full range and direction of movement, chest expansion for breathing, open sides connected with lacing, and low profile design allowing a vest to be worn under clothing or football pads, unlike traditional vests made of nylon or neoprene.

=== Backpacks ===
Using weighted backpacks is a very common form of weight. It is like clothing when properly affixed, although some backpacks require tension in the pectorals or being held on the arms to keep from sliding off if not properly affixed.

Simpler to put on and remove than weighted vests, it simulates how humans carry things, like young or injured comrades or camping supplies, rather than the storage of body fat. For most exercises, like pull-ups or push-ups, it is just as effective as a weighted vest in adding resistance from gravity. Limitations in flexibility forward or backward or to the side in arms may or may not be present depending on the pack as they vary greatly.

A standard form of military and fire fighter training is not only be able to carry a backpack, but to march and run with one loaded down with a concrete "marble". Part of SWAT training is to be able to do pull-ups wearing a heavy pack.

=== Hip drags ===
Hip drags are not as useful due to their weight, but are small attachments which add drag during many movements in swimming by making the swimmer less streamlined. This added resistance allows the swimmer to build up more force, and swim faster when they are later removed.

=== Belts ===
Different from dip belts, weighted belts are affixed to the body and do not use suspended weights or swing. They are useful, like weighted vests, in having weight close to the core and mimic very well the additional weight one might have from body fat stored in the abdomen and lower back. The advantage over other core weights is the flexibility that is freed up by not constraining the upper body, the disadvantage being limited core flexion. There tends to be some overlap in certain larger weighted vests and the region covered by certain larger weighted belts near the upper abdominal muscles.

== Upper body ==
=== Upper-arm ===
Upper arm weights are another method of adding weight close to the core beyond that of a weighted vest, or to add resistance to the shoulders with less danger to the elbows than wrist weights or the added biceps/triceps strain. A problem with these is similar to thigh weights in that those with large biceps, triceps, or fat around the region may experience tightness, and the tightness required can be straining in exercises that involve elbow extension, making it more suitable for leg and core movements.

=== Wrist ===
Wrist weights are used in place of holding dumbbells (or to supplement them) or other hand-held weights as a way of adding leveraged resistance to the movement of the arms. Like ankle weights, practicing explosive movements is not advised, and if done, should be approached gradually, with acceleration before full extension, and also reduced gradually, to avoid over-extension injuries. Wrist weights are advantageous in that they do not require a strong grip or wrist extension for added arm resistance like held hand weights do. A disadvantage is that the tightness required to stop movements could possibly increase the damages in those with carpal tunnel syndrome.

=== Gloves ===
Weighted gloves serve a similar purpose to wrist weights. Generally, they are worn to prepare for boxing in some fashion. Their advantage, beyond a slight increase in distance for leverage, is the lack of strain on the wrist from having weight isolated there, and better simulating sparring gloves. They are generally not very heavy, and since they limit the grip anyway, unless being used to practice specific striking fists, light dumbbells are more common.

== Lower body ==
=== Thighs ===
Thigh weights are the most reasonable form of resistance. The location of the mass more readily duplicates the natural fat-storage mechanism of the human body and being closer to the core. In leg raise exercises, it allows more activation of the hip flexors (and abdominals) without putting more strain on the quadriceps muscles for extension, making it good for sports-specific training on movements like knees and jumping. The greater area and safe location allow it to handle much more weight. For those with wide thighs, such as bodybuilders with large quadriceps, or people with large amounts of fat stores on the inner thigh, it may cause chafing. If worn on both legs, however, the chafing would be between the weights and only damage them, possibly only chafing with a lack of tightness.

Thigh weights are not ideal for movements involving quadriceps use, as they require tightness which may limit the use of the muscle and blood flow to the legs. For such movements, weights worn higher on the body or free weights are more ideal.

=== Ankles ===
Ankle weights are used in activities including yoga, aerobics and jogging. There are health considerations to take into account when using ankle weights.

=== Footwear ===
Weighted footwear, such as "iron" boots, sandals, and shoes, are generally very similar to ankle weights. The main difference is that being below the ankle, the calf muscle is not activated at all in wearing them. Muscles in both legs only become stimulated when the leg is raised in the air (calf flexion for the rooted leg, hip/knee/ankle for the raised leg, or the entire body if suspended from pull-up bar).

For straight-leg flexion (front and back) the slight increase in distance does increase leverage somewhat. In regard to the flexion muscles of the ankle, weighted footwear provides unique methods of working them that ankle weights do not. Leverage is best when the weight is near the tip of the foot, either above the toes or (more often) below the ball of the foot. Flexed to the front, it works the muscle opposite the calf, which is very useful as it is not a commonly activated muscle for movement, generally only a stabilizer to the calf muscle. It is very useful in retaining flexibility. The calf muscle can also be activated, but the leg must be raised behind the body as to make gravity resisting the flexion. At the front of the body, it would only assist calf flexion.

An advantage to weighted footwear is that they can be inconspicuous, depending upon the weight and the form of the footwear in question. This mainly applies to those with a fixed weight, adjustable weighted footwear is more obvious, and may not even be used as normal footwear at all inherent to their design, an example being weighted boots with a pole for the weight stack extending directly from the sole of the foot.

For footwear which can be worn normally, an advantage to wearing them beyond additional training stimulus, is their additional mass, which creates far more downward force than one would otherwise have, with foot-dropping attacks such as axe kicks and stomps. To gain this energy, more initial energy must be expended in hip flexion (and possibly knee extension) to raise the foot from the ground.

== Therapeutic use ==
Sensory integration therapy, a popular therapy for children with autism and other developmental disabilities, often employs weighted vests, weighted belts and weighted blankets, under the theory that behavioral problems such as inattentiveness and stereotypy are due to over- or under-sensitivity to sensory input, and that weighted belts and weighted blankets provide proprioceptive feedback that has a calming effect. Only a limited amount of scientific research is available on this treatment, but it suggests no significant improvement with weighted vests.

== See also ==
- Weighted blanket
