= List of exercise equipment =

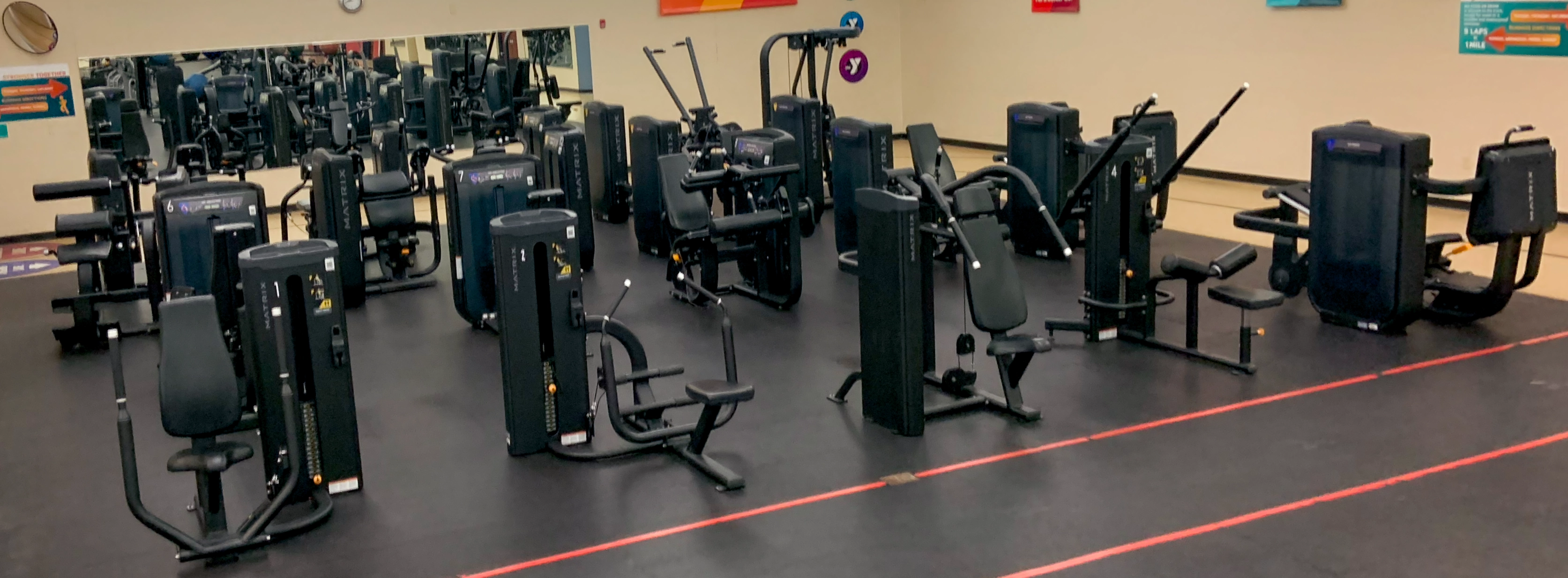
Weight machines at a YMCA

This is a list of exercise equipment, consisting of gear designed for physical exercise, strength training, calisthenics, flexibility, and physical fitness activities.

== General strength training equipment ==
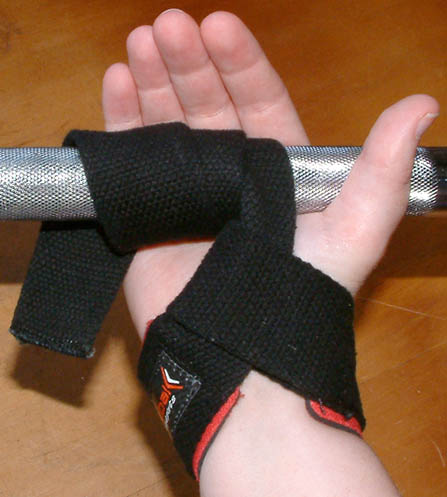
A lifting strap.

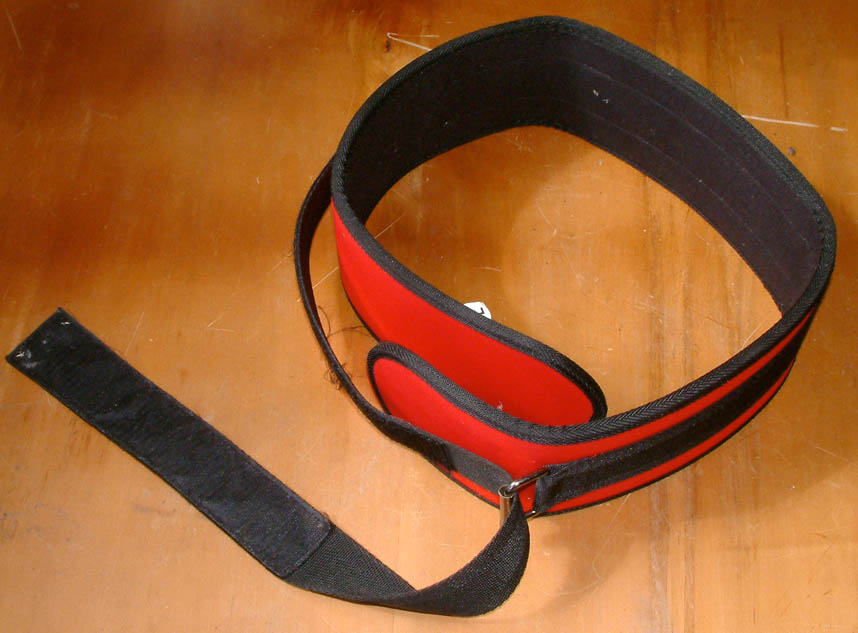
A lifting belt.

A broad range of different types of exercise equipment are available, including:

- Free-weight training:
  - Dumbbells –
    - Conventional
    - Preloaded
  - Barbells – preloaded or conventional
  - Kettlebells
  - Weight plates
    - Bumper plates
    - Steel plates
    - Micro-plates
  - Collars
- Weight machines
- Cables
- Rower grip bars
- Neck trainers – also known as neck strengthening devices or neck strengtheners, are devices designed to strengthen the neck muscles and improve mobility, flexibility, and posture through targeted stretches and strengthening exercises. They are commonly used in athletic training, physical therapy, and rehabilitation to enhance neck stability, increase muscular endurance, and support recovery from—or prevention of—neck injuries.
- Head/neck harness
- Variable resistance training:
  - Elastic bands (resistance bands): monster bands, hip circles, floss bands, mini bands
  - Chain accommodation training: chains
- Lifting accessories:
  - Straps, wraps and sleeves:
    - Lifting wrist straps
    - Wrist wraps
    - Elbow sleeves
    - Knee wraps
    - Knee sleeves
  - Grip: Gym chalk, gloves (the use of gloves during weight training is controversial. Some believe gloves improve grip, while others believe the extra material between the skin and bar worsens grip. In either case, grip strength must be trained to improve performance.)
  - Sling shots
  - Shoes (specifically made for Olympic weightlifting, squats, deadlifts, overhead press, etc.)
  - Belts (10 mm, 13 mm; small, medium, large; prong belts, lever belts)
- Flywheel training devices
  - kBox

=== Strongman (strength athlete) equipment ===
- Yokes
- Training sleds
- Logs
- Axles
- Farmer's walk handles
- Stones: Atlas stone, stone of steel (hollow ball loaded with barbells inside)
- Kegs
- General grip strength: Torsion-spring grippers, wrist rollers, rubber grips (Fat Gripz), pinch blocks, pull-up spheres
- Power pins (kettlebell loaded with barbells inside), loading pins (aka. lifting pin, barbell holder for training with weighted pull-ups, et cetera)
- Hammers, slammers, maces, clubs
- Sandbags
- Bulgarian bag

== Myofascial release and recovery tools ==
- Massage rollers
  - Foam roller – comes with or without knobs
  - Massage balls
  - Lacrosse ball
  - Spiky ball
  - Dimple ball
  - Rad roller
  - "Peanuts"

== Calisthenics and gymnastics apparatus ==
- Bachar ladder
- Barre
- Climbing boards
- Dip bar, U-shaped bar designed for being gripped by the hands while performing the dip exercise
- Exercise balls, often soft, elastic and filled with air, used in physical therapy, athletic training and exercise, and sometimes also for weight training
  - BOSU ball, an inflated rubber hemisphere ("half-ball") attached to a rigid platform, used for balance training
  - Medicine ball, a weighted ball whose diameter is about a shoulder-width, often used for rehabilitation and strength training
- Climbing rope
- Dip bar
- Horizontal bar
- Gymnastics rings
- Jungle gym
- Parallel bars (P-bars)
  - High P-bars
  - Low P-bars
- Parallettes
- Plyo box – a box used for plyometric exercises, which are a type of explosive power, like for example jumping
- Power tower (knee raise station) – used for abdominal exercises since little arm strength is needed and the movement occurs in the hips and torso. Commonly comes with a backrest and forearm rests with vertical handles at the ends of the rests.
- Push-up handle bars
- Pole
- Pommel horse
- Power tower
- Pulling-related:
  - Pull-up/dip belts
  - Peg boards
  - Pull-up bars:
    - Free standing bar
    - Wall-mounted
    - Ceiling-mounted
    - Doorway (use leverage around door frame)
    - Extending door frame (extends out to fit between door frame)
- Pole dancing poles – vertical bars used for dance and acrobatics
- Resistance bands
- Rope:
  - Jump rope
  - Rope climbing
  - Agility ladder – ground-laid rope ladder in which one can move the feet quickly across the squares to improve coordination and speed
  - Battling ropes
  - Climbing rope
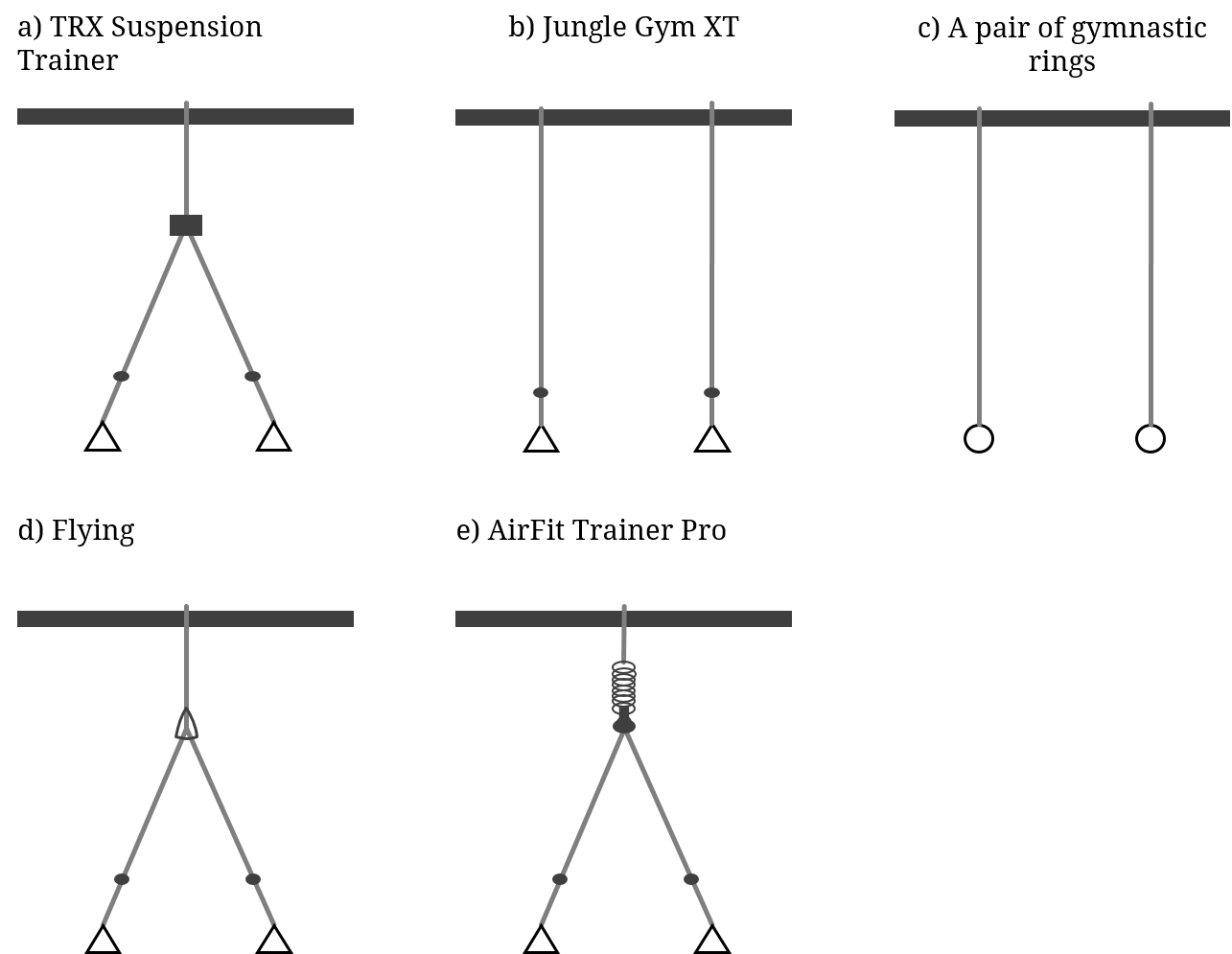
- a) TRX Suspension Trainer. b) Jungle Gym XT. c) A pair of gymnastic rings. d) Flying. e) AirFit Trainer Pro
  Suspension straps or TRX straps
  - TRX System ("Total Resistance Exercises") – suspension training scheme developed by former U.S. Navy SEAL Randy Hetrick
  - Gymnastic rings
  - Wall bars
- Roman chair – mainly used for the lower back
- Training sled
  - Scrum machine
- Vault – gymnastic apparatus and exercise, with variations including the vaulting horse and vaulting table
- Wall bars
- Weights:
  - Weighted vest
  - Ankle weights
  - Wrist weights
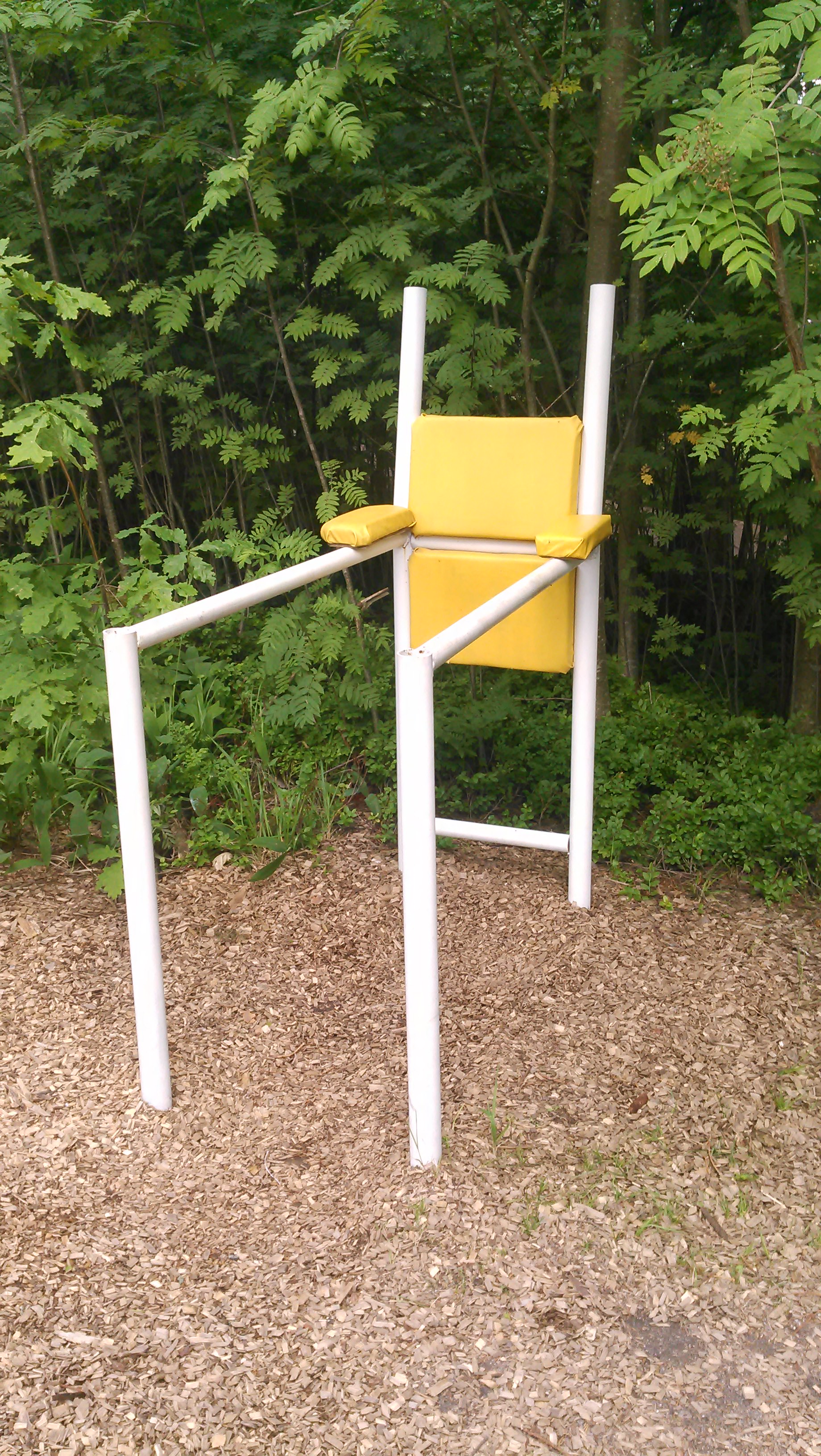
A knee raise station

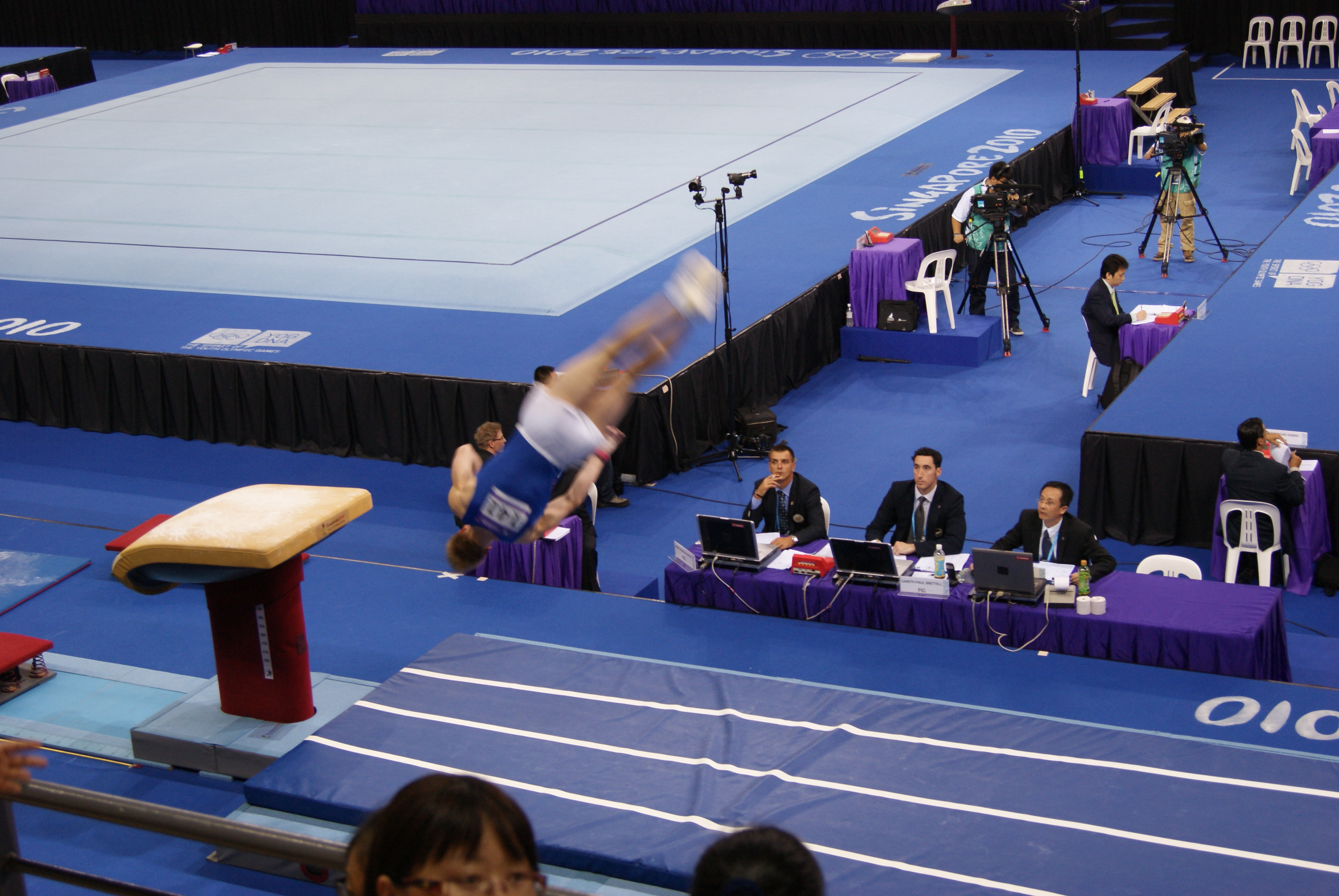
Modern vaulting table

Dip bar used for the dip exercise

Roman chair used for a hyperextension exercise

== Cardiovascular training equipment ==
- Arc Trainer
- Bicycle
- Elliptical trainer – low-impact exercise machine claimed to decrease the risk of impact injuries
  - StreetStrider – an elliptical trainer on wheels
- Jacobs Ladder
- Jump rope
- Rowing machine – machine used to simulate watercraft rowing
- Stair climbing machine
- Stationary bicycle
- Treadmill – conveyor belt used for walking or running, but also climbing and cross-country skiing, while staying in the same place
  - Treadmill desk, a computer desk where one can work on office tasks while treadmilling
- StreetStrider
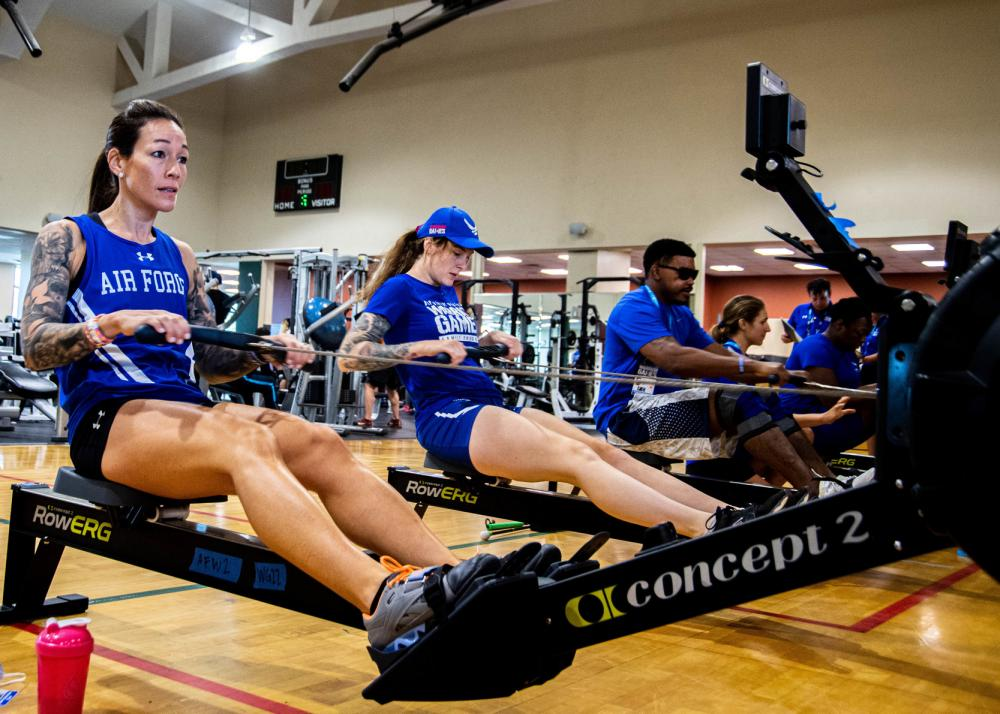
Several indoor rowers

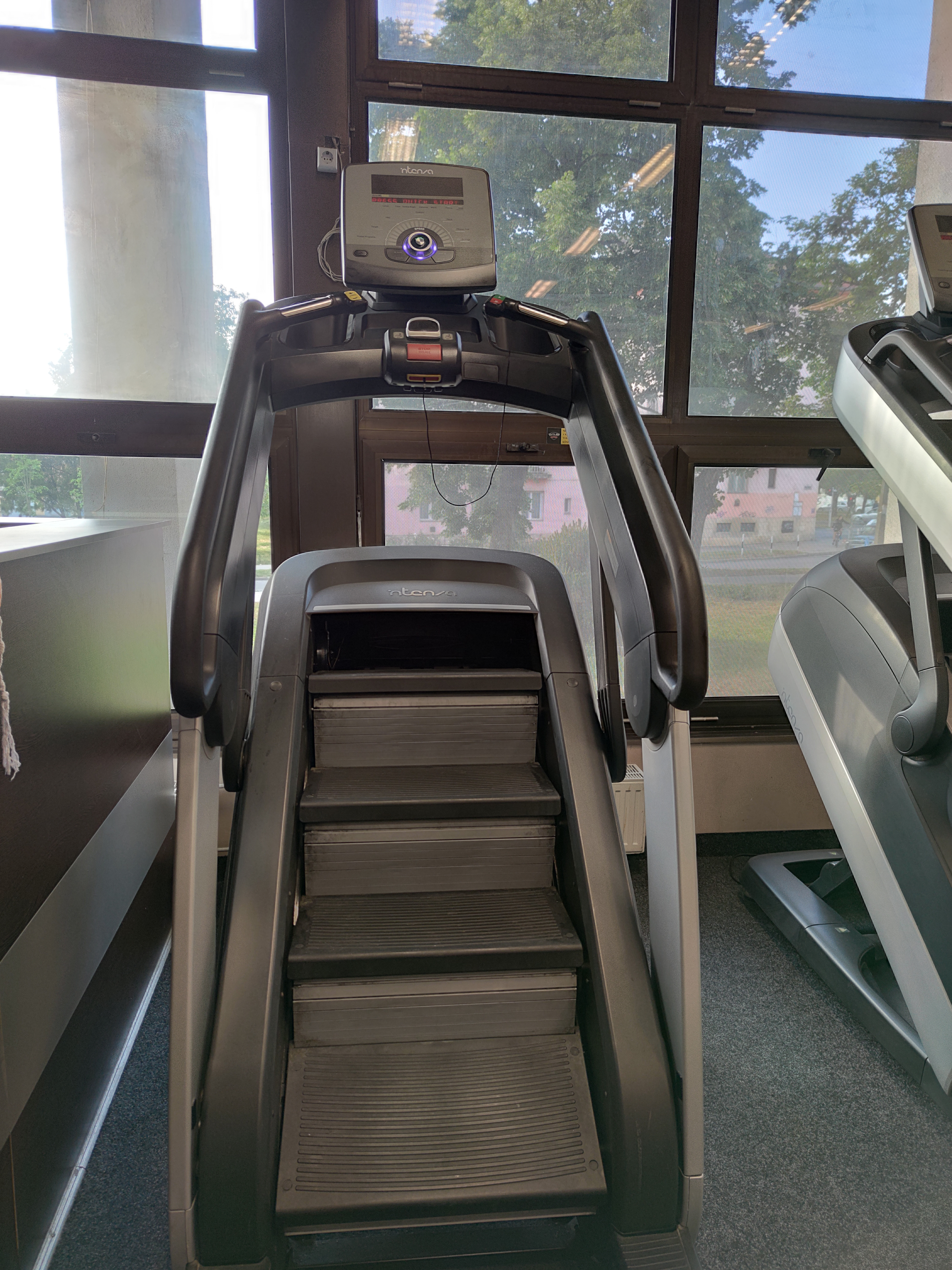
Stair machine

== Flexibility, balance, and mobility equipment ==
- Aerial straps
- Aerial yoga hammock
- Agility ladder
- Balance board
- BOSU ball
- Exercise ball
- Exercise mat
- Foam roller
- Inversion table
- Pilates reformer machine
- Slackline
- Slant board
- Yoga block
- Yoga strap

== Combat sports training equipment ==
- Body opponent bag
- Boxing gloves
- Focus mitt
- Headgear
- Punching bag
- Speed bag

== Aquatic exercise equipment ==
- Aqua cycle
- Hand paddle
- Pull buoy
- Swim fin
- Swimming boards
- Swimming machine

== Sports training equipment ==
- Batting cage
- Baseball tee
- Kicking tee
- Pitching machine
- Squash ball machine
- Tennis backboard
- The Gun (basketball)

== Measurement and monitoring devices ==
- Heart rate monitor
- Pedometer
- Fitness smartwatches
- Fitbit (fitness trackers)
- GPS watches

== Other ==
- Balance board
- Glute hamstring developers (GHD) for developing glutes and hamstrings
- Slant board
- Training masks

== See also ==
- Communications Specification for Fitness Equipment, a fitness industry-wide communications specification
- Exercise machine
- Fitness (biology)
- Fitness trail, a path with exercise equipment along its length
- High-intensity interval training
- Hojo undō, conditioning exercises used in martial arts
- Indoor rower
- Outdoor gym
- Physical exercise
- Weight training
