= MoonRun =

Exercise device

- Genre: Fitness
- Founder: Jonathan Hoffman
- Headquarters: Tel Aviv, Israel
- Products: MoonRun
- Website: www.moonrun.com

MoonRun is a type of specialized virtual training indoor aerobic exercise equipment. It was invented by Jonathan Hoffman, a physical therapist. MoonRun is suspended from a door, wall hook, or beam, similar to other sling-training exercise devices like the TRX System. It uses motion sensors and an elastic system to provide various body training, including running, jumping and turning, in a virtual environment.

== Overview ==
MoonRun is a type of suspension training system which trains the body to develop aerobic capacity, core stability, flexibility, balance, and strength. It uses motion sensors and an elastic system, and is designed to provide high-intensity yet low-impact physical training. The equipment enables natural physical movements such as running, walking, sprinting, jumping, turning, and squatting in a virtual training environment.

MoonRun can be used by professional athletes for performance enhancement, and also by people who are unable to exercise because of physical injury or lack of fitness. Developers can also create new virtual training exercise worlds for users to add to the functionality of the equipment.

== History ==
MoonRun was invented in 2016 by Jonathan Hoffman, an Australian-educated physiotherapist and human movement researcher from Tel Aviv, Israel. He founded MoonRun when he wanted to develop a novel aerobic suspension trainer for indoor exercise.

Hoffman also invented CoreAlign, an exercise training tool used by athletes such as Cristiano Ronaldo.

== See also ==
- TRX System
