= York Hall =

Multi-purpose indoor arena in London, England

Coordinates: 51°31′47″N 0°3′19″W

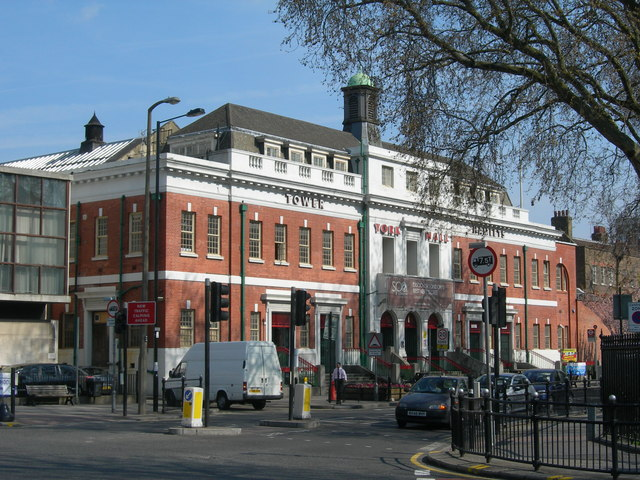
- Interactive map of York Hall
- Address: London, England
- Location: Bethnal Green
- Owner: Tower Hamlets Council
- Operator: Tower Hamlets Council
- Capacity: 1,250
- Public transit: Bethnal Green

Construction
- Opened: 1929
- Renovated: 2005

The York Hall, officially known as York Hall Leisure Centre, is a multi-purpose indoor arena and leisure centre in Bethnal Green, London. The building opened in 1929 and it is most famous as an international boxing venue with the first nights of professional boxing at the hall taking place in the late 1940s. The main hall also hosts concerts and other live events and other facilities also include a local gymnasium and a swimming pool.

== History ==
The building, which was designed by the borough engineer and architect A.E. Darby, was officially opened by the Duke and Duchess of York in 1929. It started hosting boxing events in the late 1940s.

The historic Victorian-style Turkish Bath in the basement was one of the last publicly run examples in the East End of London. In 1972 there were still six Turkish baths, a legacy of the high Jewish population of Russian and Polish origin. This included the traditional suites of Russian and Turkish steam rooms, sauna, relaxation lounge. However, the facility, which is owned by Tower Hamlets Council, was threatened with closure in 2004.

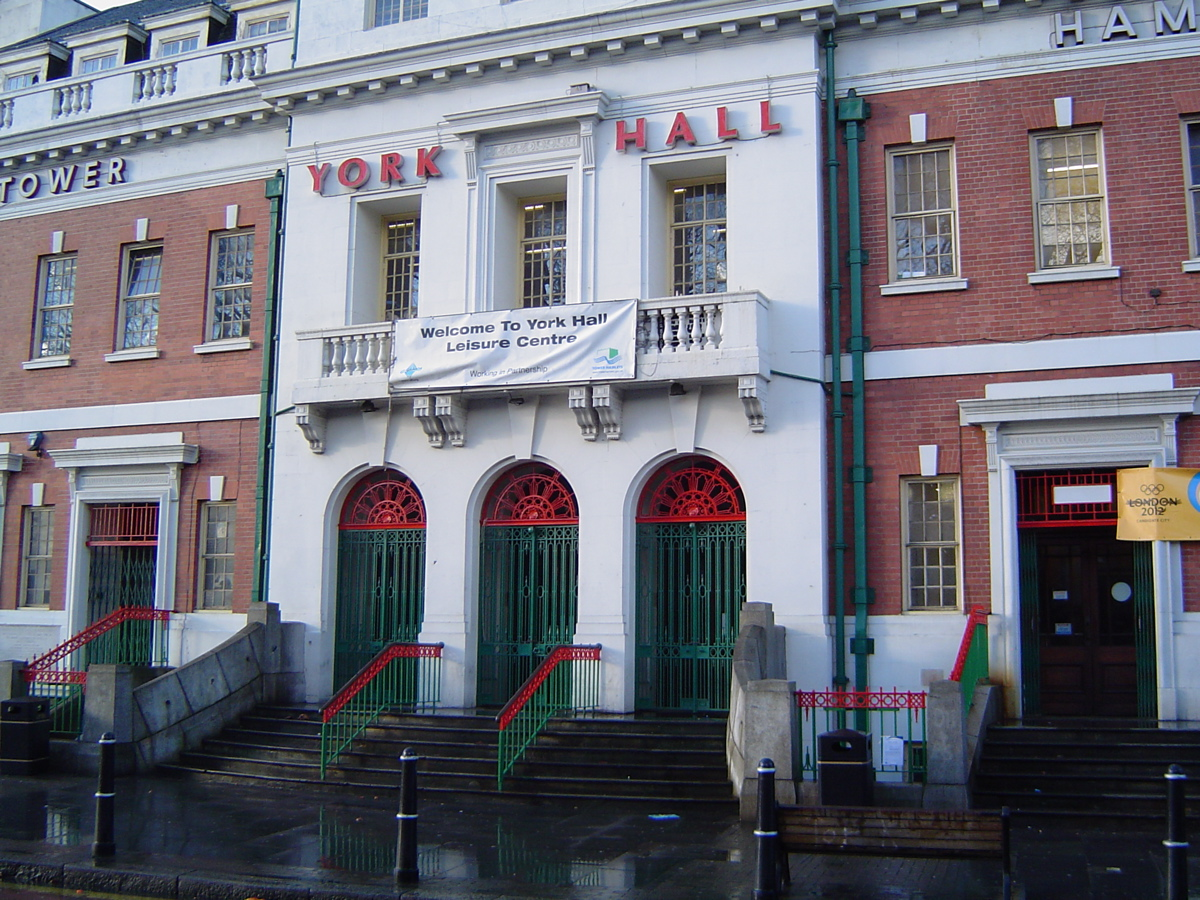
York Hall entrance

After a major refurbishment in a joint project between the local Tower Hamlets council and Greenwich Leisure, the facility was re-branded as an upmarket Spa London day spa by the council in July 2007. Treatment rooms were added to provide a range of upmarket beauty treatments and other facilities now include a hammam, large sauna, two 'aroma' steam rooms, several hot rooms, a bucket shower, ice fountain and plunge pool.

The facelift included a state-of-the-art gymnasium that doubled the size of the previous gym area, a refurbished reception area and pool, and new changing rooms. The gym features a newly installed functional area including TRX and Technogym's latest functional frame.

== Boxing and combat sports ==
The first match at York Hall took place in the late 1940s, and since then, several British boxers have had matches at the venue, including Nigel Benn, Joe Calzaghe, Chris Eubank, Carl Froch, Tyson Fury, David Haye, Anthony Joshua, Lennox Lewis and Michael Watson. It is a notable location, with Mark Turley, boxing correspondent for the BBC, writes,

Most British sports have a particular venue synonymous with their global reputation — Wembley for football, Lord's for cricket, Wimbledon's All England Club for tennis. Grand stadiums for big events. What does it say about boxing that its most iconic UK venue is so different? York Hall offers something else. It provides the chance to watch and experience boxing in the same way as people would have done in the first part of the last century, raw, immediate and unaltered by the passage of time.

It hosted Mixed Martial Arts (MMA) for the first time in 25 November 2000, when Pancrase held its Pancrase: UK event at the venue.

The press conference for the first boxing match between KSI and Logan Paul took place at the hall in July 2018. On 29 September 2019, Adam Saleh had a boxing match in that same venue against Marcus Stephenson with FouseyTube vs Slim Albaher as the co-main event.

The hall hosted the UFC London open workouts in March 2019 featuring Darren Till, Dominick Reyes and others. The hall has also hosted a number of Revolution Pro Wrestling events.

== Transport ==
York Hall is served by Bethnal Green on the London Underground and Cambridge Heath on the London Overground via Cambridge Heath Road, a range of local London Buses routes also give access, 8, 106, 254, 309, 388, D3 and D6 and night routes N8 and N253.
