= Racquet Club =

Racquet Club or similar may mean:

- Calcutta Racket Club
- Manchester Tennis and Racquet Club
- Racquet and Tennis Club, New York
- Racquet Club of Chicago
- Racquet Club of Memphis
- Racquet Club of Palm Springs, California
- Racquet Club of Philadelphia
- Racquet Club, Liverpool, England: its clubhouse was destroyed in the 1981 Toxteth riots
- Tennis and Racquet Club, Boston, Massachusetts, USA
- Racket Club, a virtual reality game that combines various racket-based sports

== Music ==
- Racket Club (album), an album by jazz guitarist Joe Morris released in 1998
