= George Barker Windship =

American physician

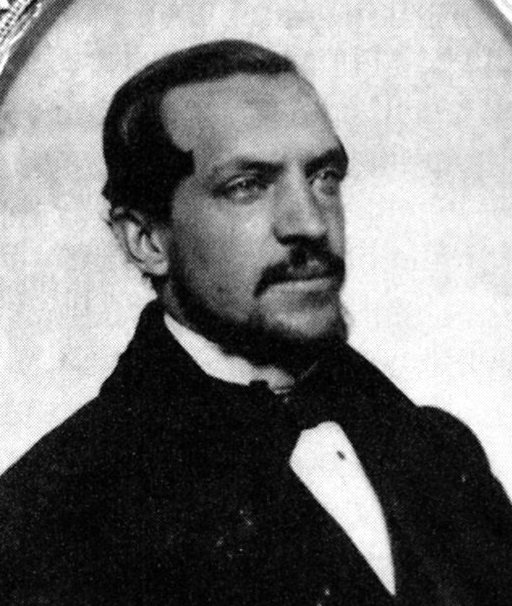
George Barker Windship

George Barker Windship (January 13, 1834 – September 12, 1876), sometimes spelled "Winship", was a Boston medical doctor most noted for his promotion of weight lifting as a route to health and strength and inventing the first adjustable dumbbell and the forerunners of several modern exercise machines.

Windship first introduced Weight Training in the United States between 1859 - 1872. He toured with lecturers and exhibitions.

He was born in Roxbury, Boston, Massachusetts, to Dr. Charles May Windship and Susan Barker. He attended Roxbury Latin School and then Harvard Medical School, where he obtained his M.D. in 1857 at the age of 20. After a brief flirtation with acting as a career, he was appointed Assistant Physician at Boston Lunatic Hospital in June, 1856. On 28 April 1868 he married Rebecca G. Haskins, daughter of Rev. Green Haskins.

When he entered Harvard at 16 he was 5 feet tall and weighed 100 pounds. Because of his stature he was the victim of relentless teasing. After a larger student threw his books downstairs and refused to apologize, Windship determined to build himself up by practicing gymnastics at the school gym, working on the various equipment, including the spring-board, horse, vaulting apparatus, parallel bars, suspended rings, horizontal and inclined ladders, pulley-weights, pegs, climbing rope, and trapezoid every evening after classes. Originally motivated by revenge, in an article published in the January 1862 Atlantic Monthly, he said that his desire for retaliation was quickly extinguished as habit and progress took its place. He discovered that his perseverance in exercise transferred to other areas of his life and he found he had gained the ability to resist and overcome other bad habits and ailments of the body, from which he coined the slogan "Strength is Health". At the time of his graduation, he could do 12 one-arm chinups with either arm and perform a one-arm chin with either arm using only his little finger.

He died 12 September 1876, in Roxbury of a stroke.
