= Racket Club =

2023 video game

Racket Club is a virtual reality game developed by Swedish studio Resolution Games that combines various racket-based sports. It was released on December 14, 2023, for VR platforms Meta Quest, Pico and SteamVR. The game includes both single-player and multiplayer modes.

== Gameplay ==
Racket Club combines elements of tennis, squash, racquetball, pickleball, padel and table tennis.

The game takes place on a playing field measuring around 2 × 2 metres, avoiding the artificial movement, such as analog stick controls or teleportation, used in some other VR tennis games. The indoor court is surrounded by transparent waist- to head-high walls. The walls can be used to return the ball from different angles, allowing for different playing strategies.

The VR controllers are used to hit the ball and apply spin.

Racket Club can also be played in a mixed reality mode, where the player's own side of the court is in the physical environment, while the opponent's side can be seen through a portal.

Players can compete against AI-controlled or human opponents represented by avatars. In a career mode, the AI opponents become increasingly stronger. Human players can be found in virtual sports clubs, which offer playing fields for singles and doubles matches. The players can communicate via audio chat and/or with gestures.

Playing games earns experience points that unlock new rackets with better features, as well as cosmetic items such as sneakers and sweatbands that can be used to customize the avatar.

There are various training modes in which players can practice hitting techniques with AI opponents or a ball machine, as well as a game mode based on badminton called “Spinminton”.

== Reception ==
Racket Club received positive reviews from critics. The ball physics, the game mechanics and the feel of the game are particularly praised. The matches are described as “short and intense”, the gameplay as “easy to learn but difficult to master” Although the single-player mode is seen as limited, the multiplayer mode is described as compelling and a clear focus of the game.
