= BOSU =

Rubber half-sphere used for fitness training

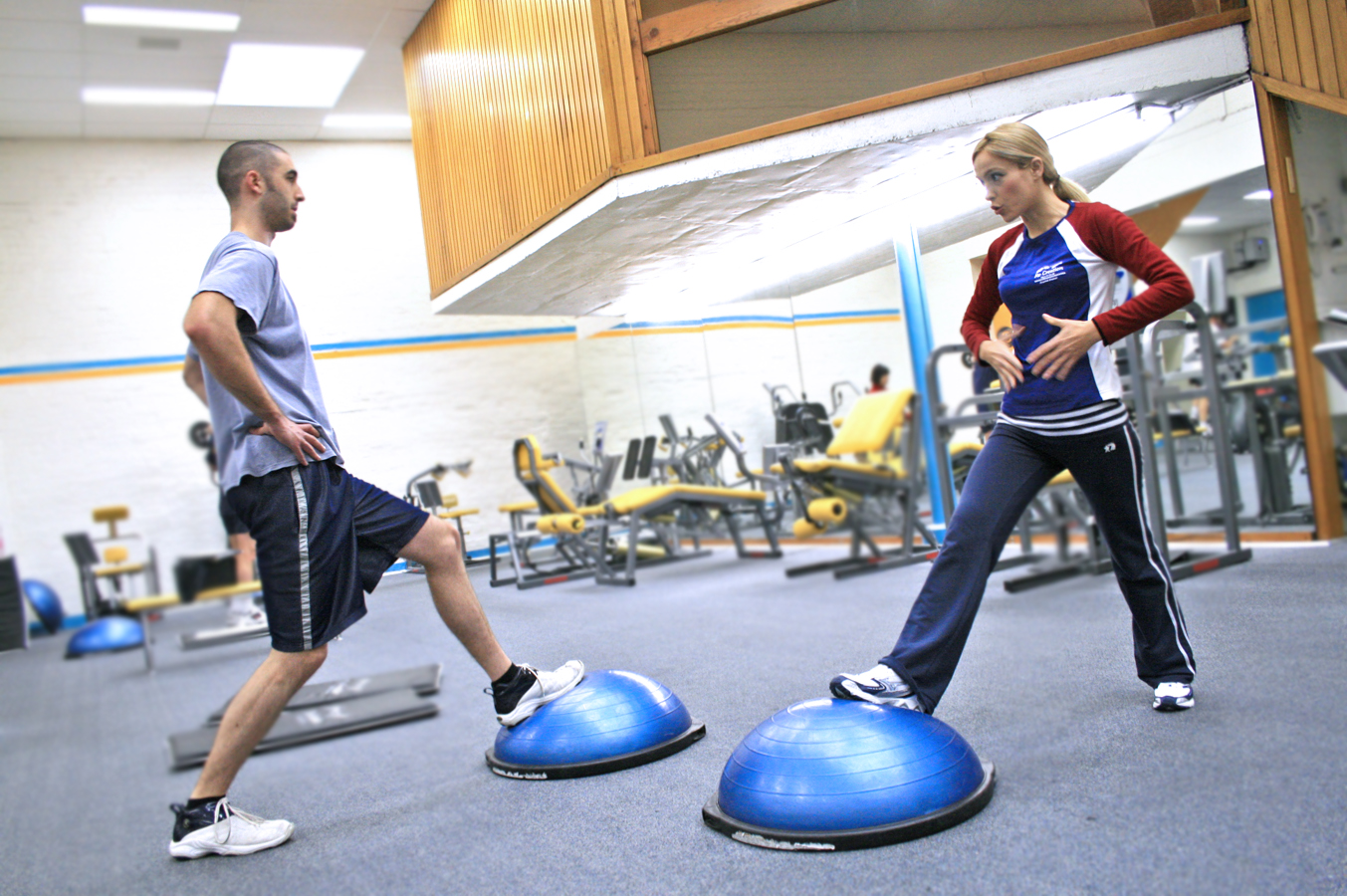
Two people in a gym using BOSU balls.

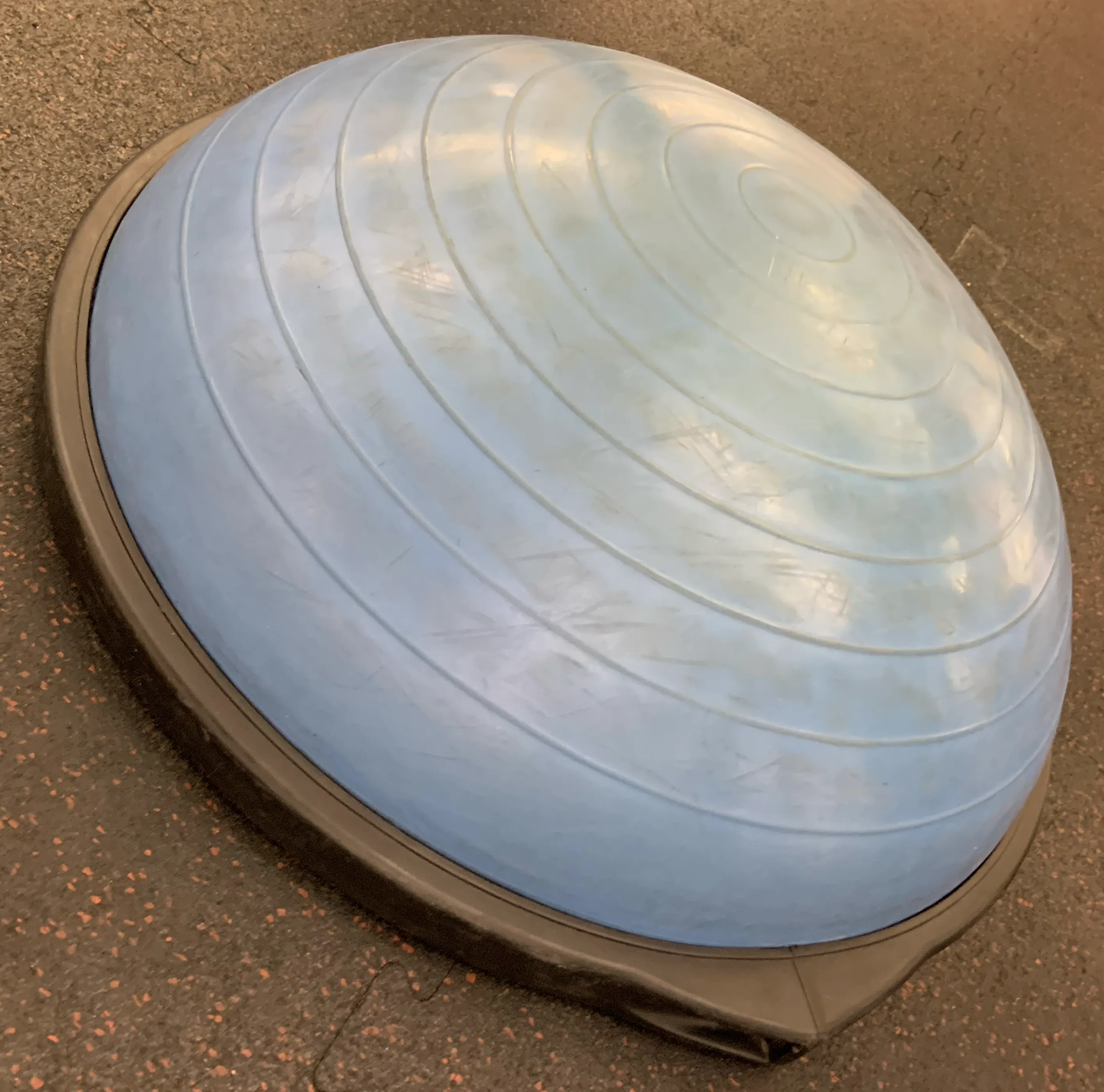
Half ab ball or BOSU Ball

A BOSU Balance Trainer (or BOSU ball) is a fitness training device used for balance training, consisting of an inflated rubber hemisphere attached to a rigid platform invented in 1999 by David Weck. When the dome side faces up, the BOSU ball provides an unstable surface while the device remains stable and can be used for athletic drills and aerobic activities. This combination of stable/unstable allows a wide range of users, from the young, elderly, or injured to the elite level athlete. The device can be flipped over so that the platform faces up, and the device is highly unstable in this position and can be used for other forms of exercise. One can attempt to sit and bounce on one, but unlike the standard stability ball, the fixed position wont give much bounce, but can be utilized for core training.

The name initially came from an acronym standing for “Both Sides Up" - a reference to the two ways a BOSU ball can be positioned. It is also referred to as the "blue half-ball", because it looks like a stability ball cut in half. The acronym now favored by the creators is "BOth Sides Utilised".
