= Training masks =

Facial mask that limits the intake of air during breathing

Training masks are facial masks worn to limit the intake of air during breathing. Their ostensible purpose is to strengthen the respiratory musculature by making it work harder. There is some evidence that they may improve endurance capacity (VO_{2} max) and power output, but research into their benefits has so far generally proven inconclusive.

== Training masks ==
Training masks allow users to actively work on their respiratory muscle fitness.

Originally designed to simulate training at altitude, the concept failed to deliver in multiple research trials. Training in hypoxic (low oxygen) environments increases red blood cell mass and improves oxygen transport, giving athletes a measurable performance boost when competing at sea level. The use of training masks, however, has no measurable effect on haemoglobin, hematocrit levels and oxygen transport in athletes, as they do not alter the oxygen concentration of the air taken in.

However, they appear to add resistance to the respiratory muscles by limiting air supply, thus triggering an adaptive physiological response. The muscles of respiration, from the diaphragm and the intercostals to the assisting musculature, need to be trained like any other muscles to increase resistance to fatigue and maximize performance. Respiratory Muscle Training (RMT) is a training method developed to condition the muscles of respiration specifically. RMT has been shown to markedly improve strength, speed, power and endurance in athletes. Preoperative Respiratory Muscle Training (RMT), or Inspiratory Muscle Training (IMT), is also used in the patients who are scheduled to undergo cardiac or abdominal surgery aiming to reduce the risk of postoperative pulmonary complications.

Training masks allow athletes to strengthen their respiratory muscle fitness without having to be confined to stationary devices or special facilities. By restricting the user's breathing, the devices may improve cardiorespiratory fitness, leading to better sport performance. This is especially relevant to elite athletes, where the pulmonary system may become a limiting factor.

During a 6-week high-intensity training program, moderately trained subjects using training masks were found to have improved their endurance capacity (VO_{2} max) and power output significantly. While observing that the respiratory muscle loading improved performance across multiple metrics, the researchers speculated that the performance increases may also have been attributable to the re-breathing of expired air, which would mean at least some of the positive results were due to improved CO_{2} tolerance.

There is conflicting research on the performance benefits of RMT, some challenging the assumption that an increase in inspiratory muscle fitness translates to better work capacity and athletic performance. A comprehensive review of the literature by Gigliotti et al. (2006) concluded that RMT does improve relevant performance markers in well-controlled and rigorously designed studies, but the mechanisms behind these improvements are not fully understood and require further research.

== See also ==
- Cardiorespiratory fitness
- Aerobic conditioning
- VO_{2} max
