= Exercise ball =

Type of ball

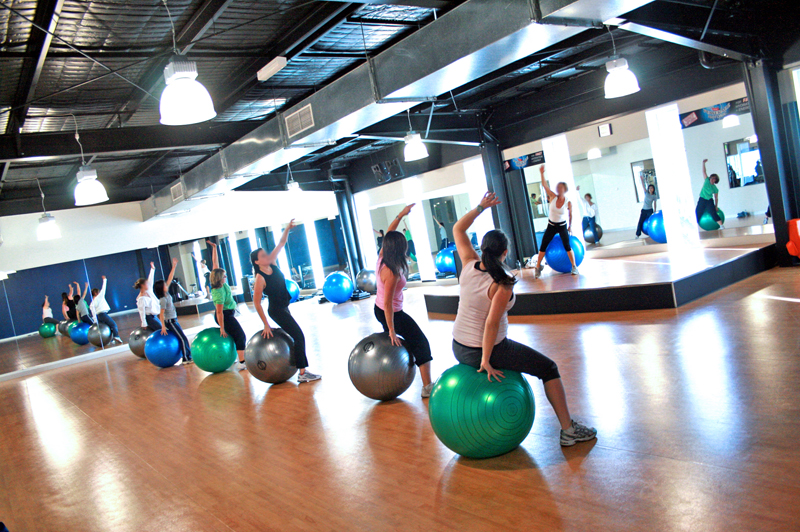
An exercise class using exercise balls

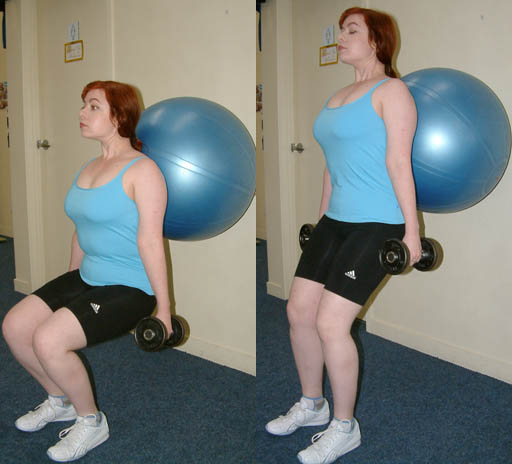
A wide range of exercises can be performed with an exercise ball.

An exercise ball is a ball constructed of soft elastic, typically in 5 diameters of 10 cm increments, from 35 to 95 cm (14 to 37 in), and filled with air. The air pressure is changed by removing a valve stem and either filling with air or letting the ball deflate. It is most often used in physical therapy, athletic training and exercise. It can also be used for weight training.

The ball is also known by various other names, for instance: balance ball, birth ball, sitball, body ball, fitness ball, gym ball, gymnastic ball, physio ball, pilates ball, Pezzi ball, stability ball, Swedish ball, Swiss ball, therapy ball, yoga ball, or medicine ball.

== History ==
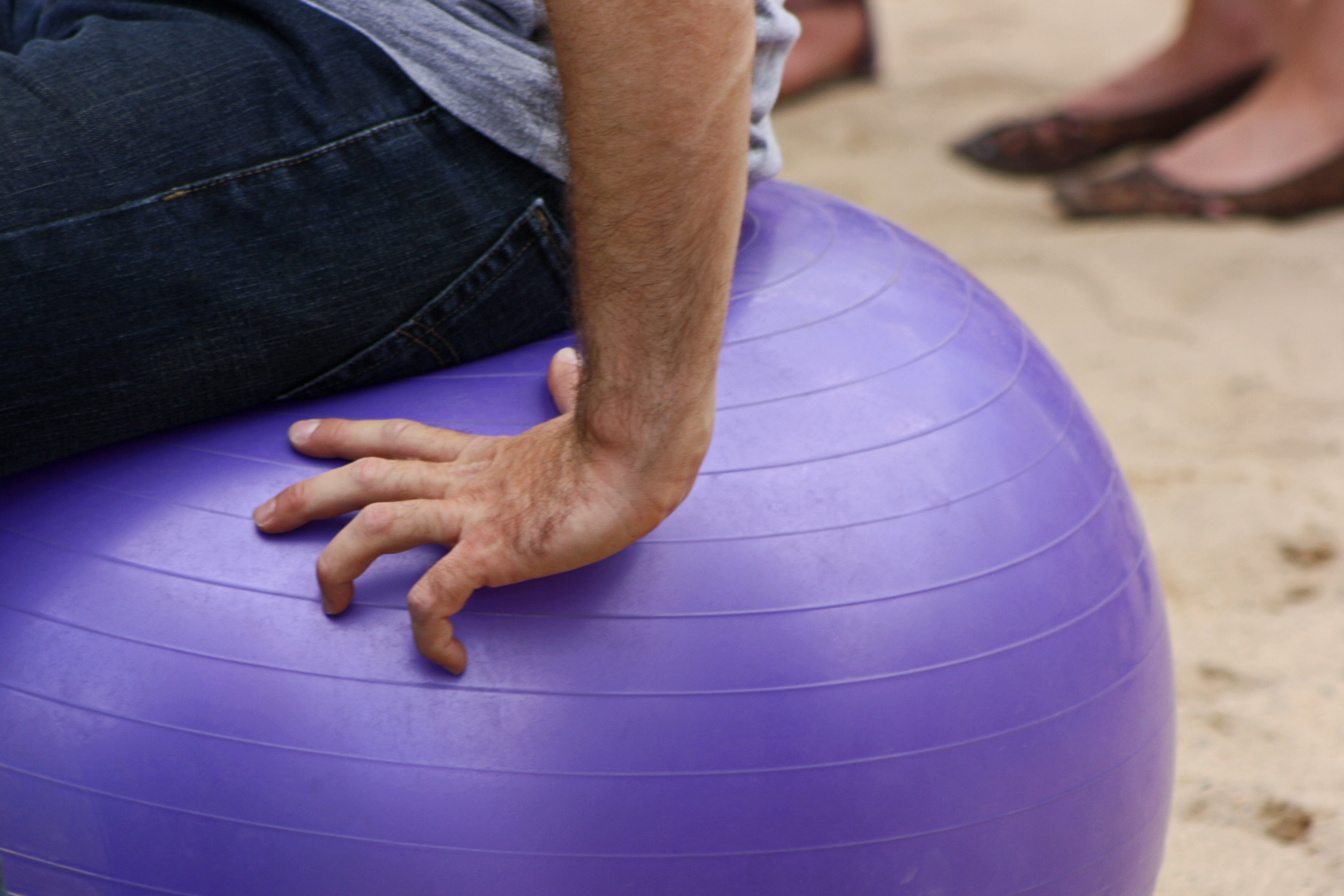
A man sitting on a purple exercise ball

The physical object known as a "Swiss Ball" was developed in 1963 by Aquilino Cosani, an Italian plastics manufacturer. He developed a process for moulding large puncture-resistant plastic balls. According to American physical therapist Joanne Posner-Mayer, the use of the exercise ball as a therapy tool probably begins with the Swiss pediatrician Dr. Elsbeth Köngan, an early advocate of the Bobath concept. Those balls, then known as "Pezzi balls", were first used in treatment programs for newborns and infants by Mary Quinton, a British physiotherapist working in Switzerland.

Later, Dr. Susanne Klein-Vogelbach, the director at the Physical Therapy School in Basel, Switzerland, integrated the use of ball exercise as physical therapy for neuro-developmental treatment. In 1985, she published a famous book “Ballgymnastik zur funktionellen Bewegungslehre” (“Ball Gymnastics for functional movement theory”), where she described several exercises with the ball. Klein-Vogelbach advocated the use of ball techniques to treat adults with orthopedic or medical problems.

In 1995, Joanne Posner-Mayer published a book "Swiss Ball Applications for Orthopedic and Sports Medicine" in the US. As American physical therapists began to use ball exercises, the term became common in the US. From their development as physical therapy in a clinical setting, those exercises are now used in athletic training, as part of a general fitness routine and incorporation in alternative exercises such as yoga and Pilates.

The fastest time to jump across 10 Swiss balls is 7.8 seconds and was achieved by Neil Whyte (Australia) on the set of CCTV - Guinness World Records Special in Beijing, China on 12 January 2016. The most push-ups performed on four Swiss balls in one minute is 31 and was achieved by Neil Whyte (Australia) on the set of CCTV Guinness World Records Special in Beijing, China, on 17 August 2011. Neil also made the record for the furthest jump between two Swiss balls at a distance of 2.3 meters in 2006.

== Benefits ==
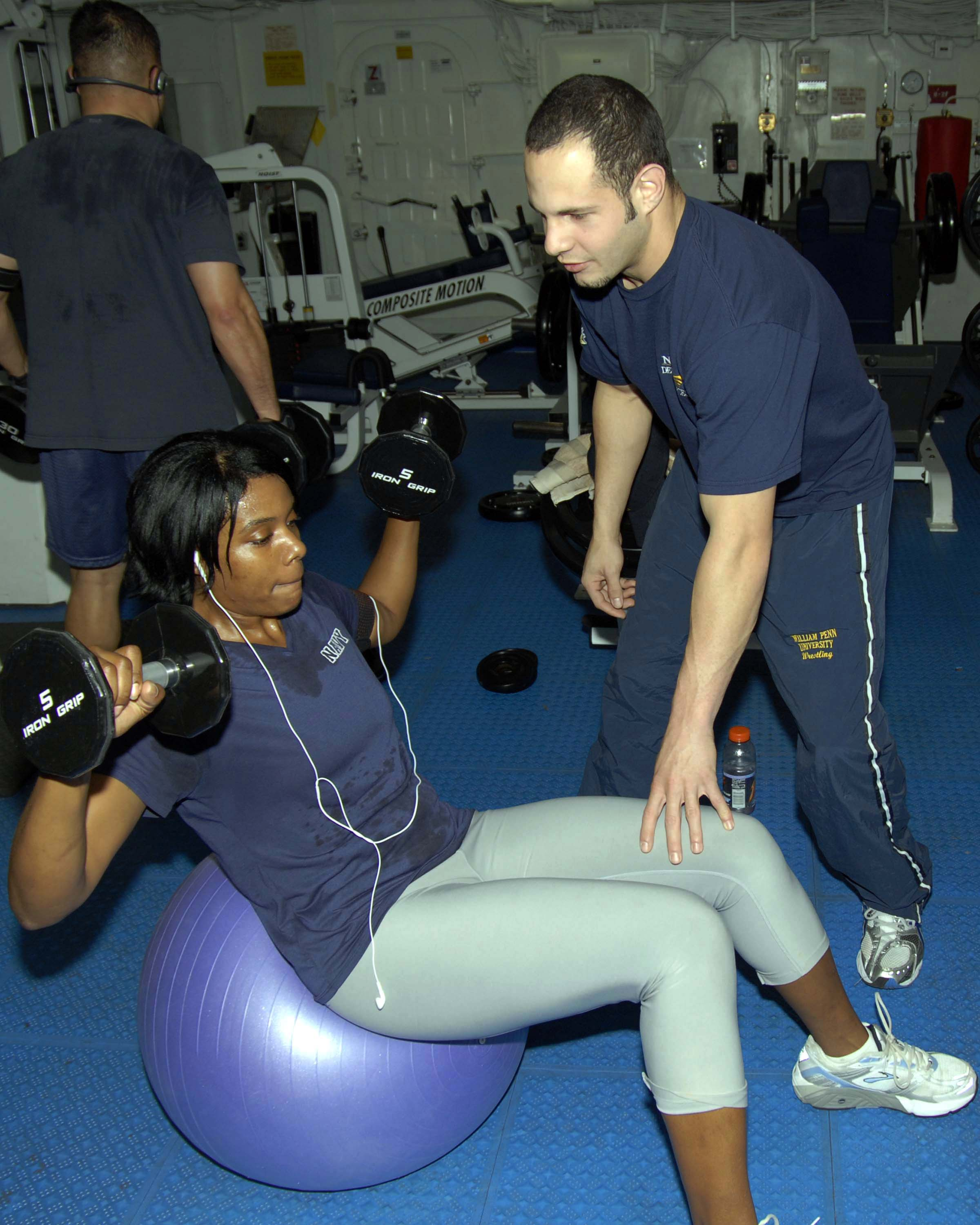
A woman performing weighted sit-ups on an exercise ball.

A primary benefit of exercising with an exercise ball as opposed to exercising directly on a hard flat surface is that the body responds to the instability of the ball to remain balanced, engaging many more muscles (so-called “unstable training”). Those muscles become stronger over time to keep balance. Some dumbbell exercises, such as dumbbell fly can be performed on a ball. Ball exercises are popular among runners.

Most frequently, the core body muscles (the abdominal muscles and back muscles) are the focus of exercise ball fitness programs.

Using an unstable surface recruits more muscle units without increasing the total load. The greatest benefit of moving an exercise onto an unstable surface is achieving a better activation of the core musculature, exercises such as curl-up or push-up performed on an exercise ball. An unstable surface increases activation of the rectus abdominis muscles (abdominals) and allows for greater activity per exercise when compared to a stable surface. Exercises such as a curl-up on an exercise ball yields a greater amount of electromyographic (EMG) activity (electrical activity produced by muscles) compared to exercises on a stable platform. Performing standard exercises, such as a push-up, on an unstable surface can be used to boost activation of core trunk stabilizers and in turn provide increased trunk strength and greater resistance to injury.

== Other uses ==
There is no scientific evidence of benefits from sitting on exercise balls without additional exercises.

This large plastic ball, known as a "birth ball", can also be used during labour to aid the descent of the fetal head into the pelvis. Sitting in an upright position will also aid fetal positioning and is more comfortable for the woman. Sitting on the ball with arms placed on a bed, table or otherwise sturdy object for support and gently rocking the hips may help with the contractions and aid the natural physiological process of birth. However, using the ball as an alternative to normal seating (such as in the office) can result in discomfort due to the lack of back support.

Eight exercise balls are used in the game Treibball. In the context of this sport, the balls are referred to as "rolling sheep".

== See also ==
- List of inflatable manufactured goods
- Medicine ball
- Baoding balls
- BOSU
- Water ball

== Bibliography ==
- Klein-Vogelbach, Susanne (1985). Ballgymnastik zur funktionellen Bewegungslehre [Ball gymnastics for functional movement theory]. Rehabilitation und Prävention (in German) (2d ed.). Springer-Verlag Berlin Heidelberg. doi:10.1007/978-3-662-05975-3. ISBN 978-3-540-13925-6.
- Posner-Mayer, Joanne (1995). Swiss Ball Applications for Orthopedic & Sports Medicine: A Guide for Home Exercise Programs Utilizing the Swiss Ball. Ball Dynamics International. ISBN 9780964534148.
- Crawford, Elisabeth (2000). Balance on the ball: exercises inspired by the teachings of Joseph Pilates. Equilibrio. ISBN 978-0970371607. First published book to incorporate an exercise ball into Pilates exercises.
