= The Gun (basketball) =

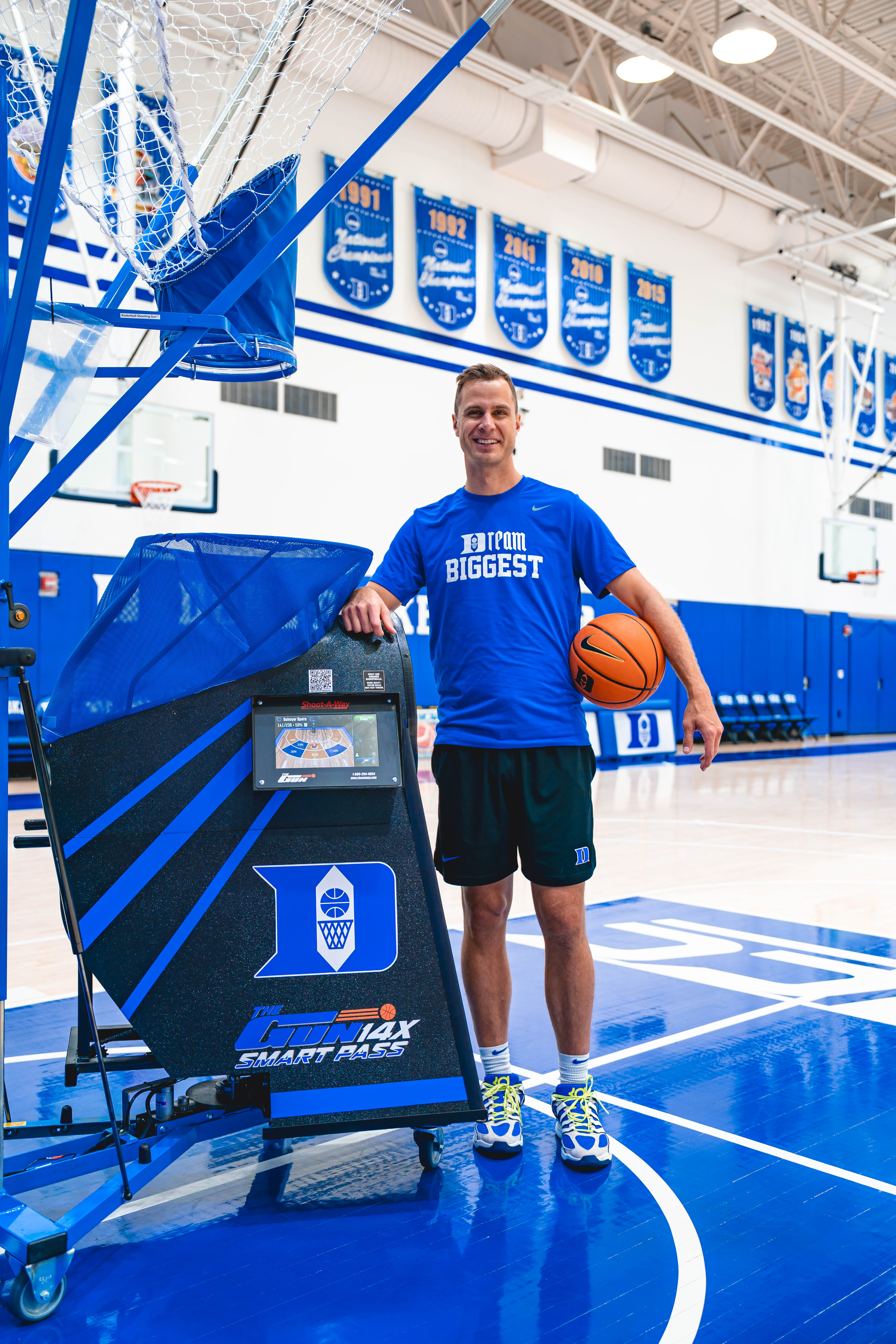
The Gun 14X Basketball Shooting Machine at Duke University with Men's Basketball Head Coach Jon Scheyer (August 2025)

The Gun is an automated basketball shooting machine and rebounding tool used by basketball players to enhance their shooting skills. "These high-tech machines are placed under a basket where they catch shots and throw the ball back to players." It allows for players to take more shots in less time, while it "enhances muscle memory through repetition by keeping players moving and catching, shooting and moving to the next spot on the court."

== History ==
The Gun was invented by John Joseph in 1998, although the first basketball Gun was not purchased until 1999 by the University of Florida. As of 2025, over 38,000 basketball Guns are being used by high schools, colleges, and the NBA. Joseph had previously invented a non-automated rebounding device known as the "Shoot-A-Way," for which he filed a patent for in 1984. Like the Shoot-A-Way, the Gun has a "collection net [that] can be adjusted from 11 feet to 14 feet to force players to shoot with the right amount of arch depending on where they are shooting from." Although unlike the Shoot-A-Way, which used tracks to return the ball to the player, the Gun returns the ball by shooting the ball back to the player at a previously set speed and time, this function allows for the player to take up to 1800 shots every hour. This function also allows for a ball to be passed every two seconds, which allows a player to take 200 shots in 10 minutes. Currently there are 4 models of the basketball Gun invented by John Joseph; The Gun 6000, The Gun 8000, The Gun 10K, The Gun 12K, The Gun 14X Smart Pass.

== The Gun 6000 ==
The Gun 6000 is a basketball shooting machine developed by Shoot-A-Way and released in 1998. Designed by John Joseph, the model was built to rebound both made and missed shots and return the ball to the player for continuous shooting. Features included a timing device that allowed players to adjust the distance and speed of return passes, along with shot tracking for attempts, makes, and shooting percentage.

== The Gun 8000 ==
The Gun 8000 is a basketball shooting machine developed by Shoot-A-Way and released on September 1, 2009. Designed by John Joseph, the model introduced a touchpad for selecting pass locations, a time-delay feature between passes, and the ability to set the number of passes from each spot before the machine rotates. It also included a mode that required players to make a set number of shots before the machine advanced to the next location. The Gun 8000 allowed users to print a receipt summarizing shooting statistics such as makes, attempts, and percentages.

== The Gun 10K ==
The Gun 10K is a basketball shooting machine developed by Shoot-A-Way and released in 2017. Designed by John Joseph, the 10K introduced a touchscreen interface that allows players to select pass locations, adjust time delays between passes, and set the number of passes from each spot before the machine rotates. Users can also program the sequence of passing locations for customized drills. Additional features include an optional Bluetooth speaker system for music playback and built-in stat tracking through the Shoot-A-Way mobile app.

== The Gun 12K ==
The Gun 12K is a basketball shooting machine developed by Shoot-A-Way and released in 2021. The model introduced live heatmap analytics to track shooting performance, along with a fully interactive touchscreen that allows for unlimited programmable locations. It also includes a 19-inch front display designed to provide players with instant feedback, drill instructions, and other training information.

== The Gun 14X Smart Pass ==
The Gun 14X is a basketball shooting machine developed by Shoot-A-Way and released in 2025. It features Smart Pass™ Technology, which automatically adjusts pass distance based on player height and shot location, with options for chest or bounce passes to simulate game-speed scenarios. The machine is equipped with a touchscreen interface that enables drag-and-drop drill programming, live heatmap tracking, multiplayer statistics, and a training mode known as Decision Mode™, designed to incorporate decision-making into shooting practice. The Gun 14X is manufactured in the United States and has been adopted by a variety of basketball programs, coaches, and trainers for player development.
