= Squash ball machine =

A squash ball machine is a mechanical device that automatically throws out squash balls at different speeds and angles. Its main purpose is to help players to develop their ball hitting technique.

== Overview ==
The features of squash ball machines are modeled after the rules of squash and the constituency of squash balls.

Squash is a ballgame that is played by hitting a ball with a racket against a wall, similar to a backboard, so that the ball bounces off the wall. The opponent player has to hit the ball back against the wall without letting the ball bounce more than once. The game can be played either by two people (the "singles" version), or by four people (the doubles version), in either a smaller court (singles and softball doubles) or a larger one (hardball doubles).

The balls used in squash are small rubber balls that can differ in terms of diameter, weight and softness. These features determine the speed and bouncing amplitude of the ball, with softer balls being generally slower than the harder balls. The temperature of the ball also affects the amount of bounce: the warmer the ball, the more it bounces. Because cold squash balls have little bounce, the squash balls are hit multiple times at the beginning of a game to warm them up. It also means that a game becomes gradually faster as it advances and that softer balls may be too slow to be used in colder climates.

== Design ==
Because squash balls bounce with different amplitude and frequency depending on their temperature, squash ball machines need to encompass this feature and allow for heating the balls first to give the right feel. The heating system makes squash ball machines different from tennis ball machines which only pump out balls at different speeds and angles.

The heating function of the machine can be turned down or off, e.g. for slower balls in beginner practices. In higher-end machines, the heat is thermostatically controlled to automatically keep the balls at game temperature.

The currently available models have ball capacities of 50-60 balls. Both ball speed range and ball frequencies are adjustable and vary from 30 to 150 km/h and 1.5-12 balls per second, respectively, with the .75 second interval suitable for quick volleys and 10 second interval for other strokes. Changing the speed and frequency of the ball coming out of the machine is intended to help the player to visualize real-game situations where the ball does not always come back into play at the same speed. The adjustable speed is also useful for increasing the speed as the player becomes more skillful.

The machines have different modes and functions for practicing forehands and backhands, fixed, random, decay, interval training, vertical swing, lob and drop. They are powered by electrical AC and DC power supplies and can be controlled remotely. Protective eyewear is recommended while using the machine.

Squash ball machines cannot be used for squash tennis which is played with tennis balls that are considerably bigger than squash balls.

== Uses ==
Squash ball machines are used as training aids both by solo players and by coaches in squash practices.

Individual players use the machine as a feeding (serving) device in the absence of other players to practice their swinging technique and to develop footwork and timing.

In connection with coaching, the following benefits have been mentioned:

- The use of the machine leaves the coach free from feeding the ball and allows closer observation of the student from different angles.
- The coach is able to demonstrate correct technique more frequently and effectively by doing alternate hitting with the student, with the coach hitting and the student trying to imitate the swing.
- The machine allows the coach to physically manipulate the students' swing, by holding the racket in the correct position.
- It allows for realistic hitting angles and positions, and to establish a continuous rhythm of play. Continuous, flowing practices are more enjoyable for the student, however they often result in an unrealistic hitting angles. For example when feeding for a drop volley, coaches often stand in a position in front of the pupil. If the coach is skillful then this allows the practice to flow and be continuous, but unfortunately means the pupil is learning to hit the ball short off of a drive from the front court with their opponent in front of them - when in the game this shot is almost always played off of a length ball with the opponent behind. With a machine, coaches can set up continuous practices that are always using realistic angles and positions.
- In a group practice, the coach is able to give advice specific to one player without having to stop the practice for other students, something he would have to do if he were the one doing the feeding.
- If used in combination with a drilling partner, the ball machine can be used to develop front-court tactics.
- Students acquire technique more easily if they are able to learn in rhythm. The machines allows for a continuous rhythm to be established. The student can miss, miss-hit, or hit the ball down/out and the next ball will still arrive in the rhythm that has been set. Without the machine the rhythm is broken while the misdirected ball is fetched.

== Limitations ==
The main limitation of the ball machine is the same as its main benefit, that of excluding a human partner. Because competitive games are played against another person, the singular use of the machine would mean that a player would not learn to anticipate and react to the movement of the ball from the opponent player based on "pre-impact cues" that precede the time the ball is struck, missing valuable time for planning his or her own response, and would not develop tactical skills. Because balls that are thrown by the machine are independent of player's own strokes, the player would also not develop self-reflection and awareness about his or her role in directing the game.

== See also ==
- Bowling machine
- Pitching machine
