= Slant board =

Flat surface set at an angle

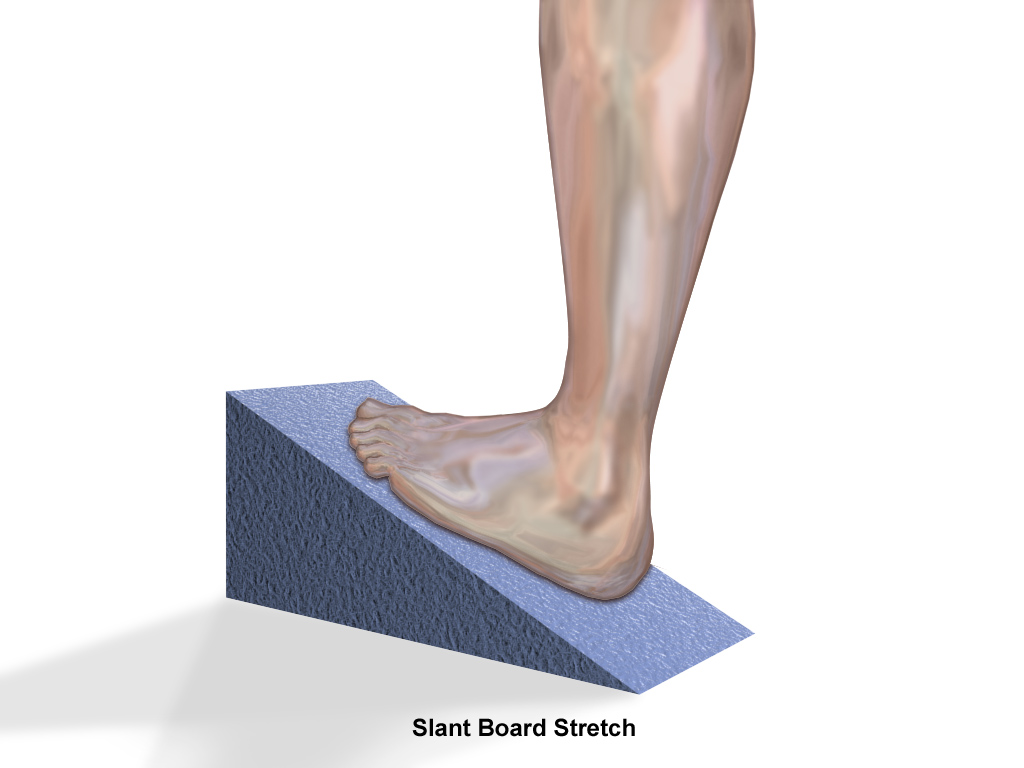
A slant board stretch

A slant board is a flat surface set at an angle or slant. Such boards may be used for a variety of purposes.

== Movies ==
Movie studios provide them for actors to rest on between performances to avoid wrinkling costumes.

== Exercise ==
There are two varieties for exercises:

1. a long padded board which will accommodate the full length of the lying body
2. a smaller wooden platform for standing upon.

The calf muscles or triceps surae may be stretched by a daily exercise of standing upon a slant board.
