= Wall bars =

Exercise equipment

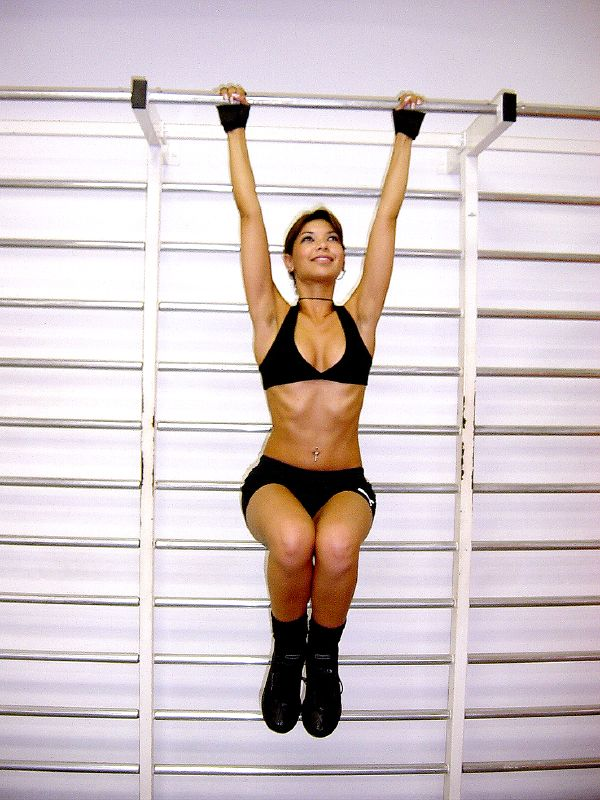
Amanda Françozo using wall bars.

Gymnastic wall bars (also known as a gymnastic ladder, Swedish ladder, Swedish wall or as stall bars) are a gymnastics training apparatus invented by Pehr Henrik Ling and popularized in Sweden.

== History ==
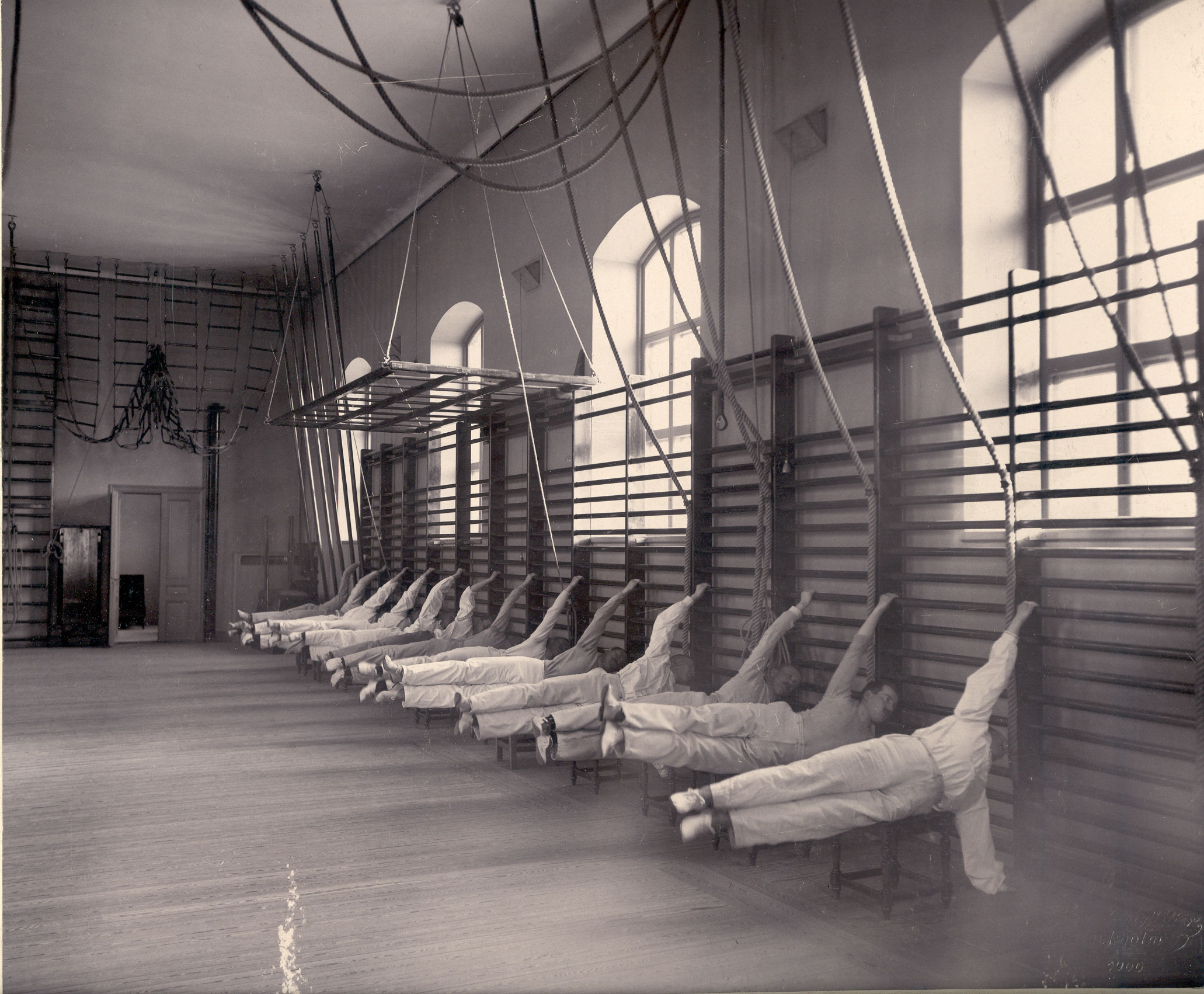
Gymnasts at the Royal Gymnastics Central Institute of Stockholm, 1900.

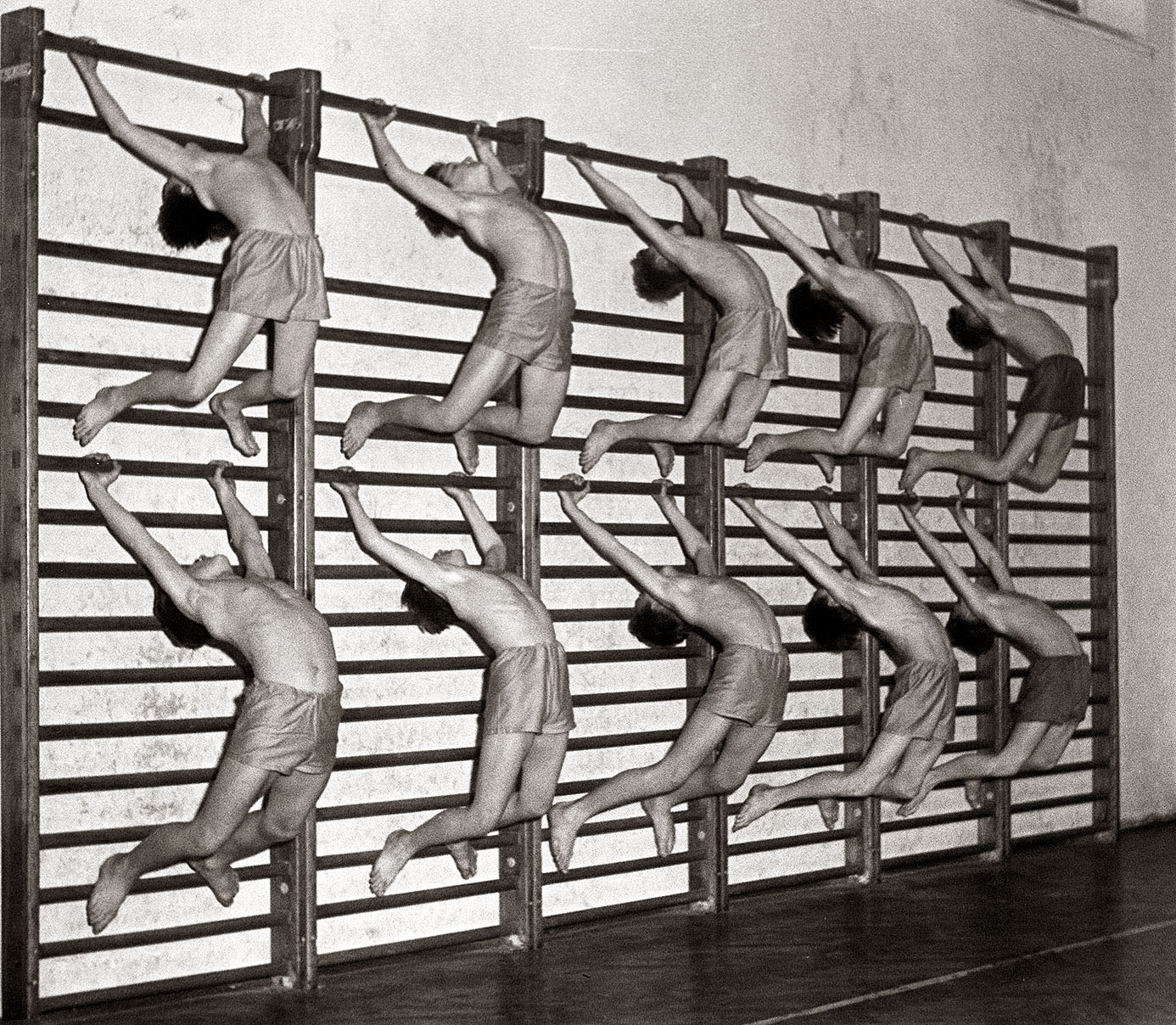
Yugoslav boys using wall bars, 1957.

Wall bars were invented at the beginning of the 19th century by the Swedish teacher Pehr Henrik Ling who, when suffering from arthritis, realized the therapeutic potential of wall-bars exercise. With the support of the Swedish king, Ling founded The Royal Institute for Gymnastics, where he taught gymnastics as an art, which later became the working system across all of Europe. He later invented the vaulting box.

With the arrival of immigrants in America, the wall bars were quickly adopted in the USA.

== Apparatus ==
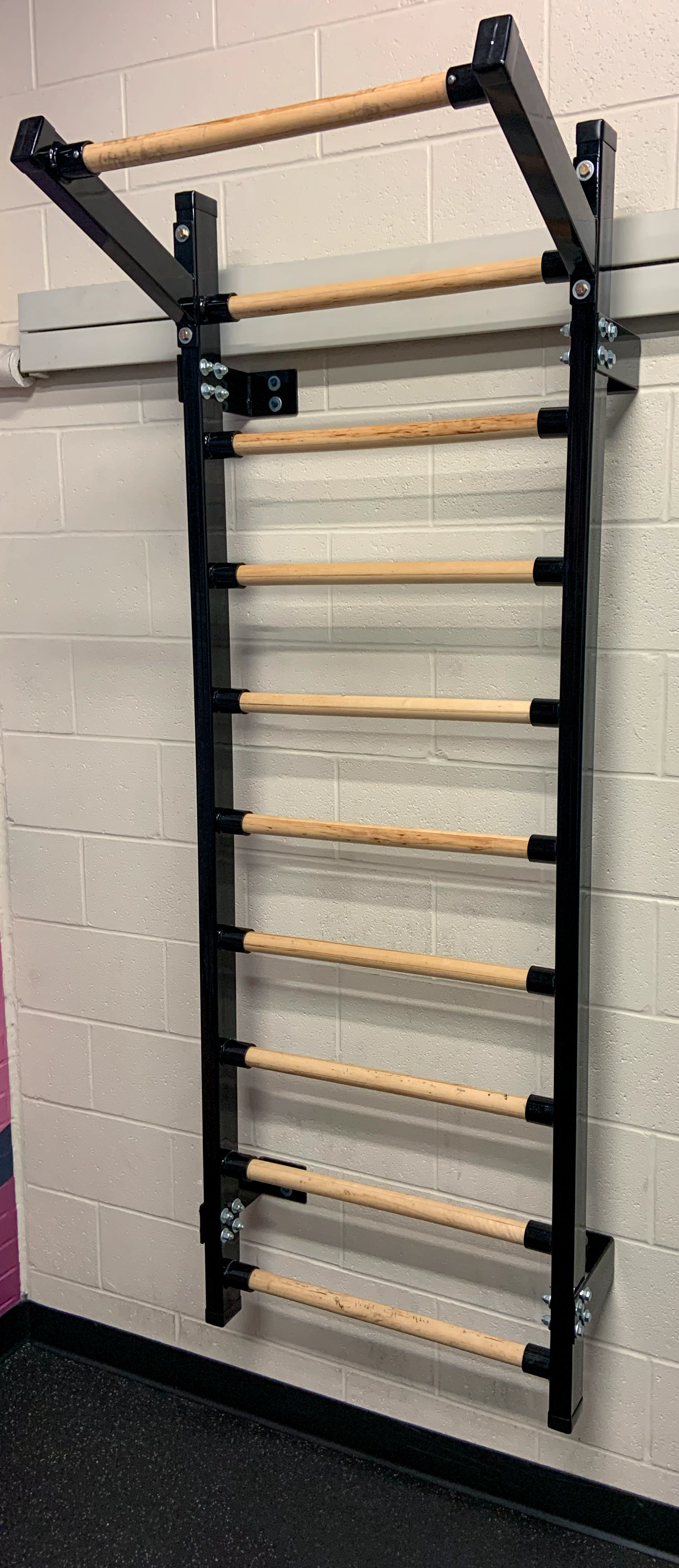
Wall bars

Gymnastic wall bars are a multifunctional device, made of lamellar beech timber. They can be manufactured in different sizes, from the recovery, for children, up to the double, which may have a size of 2.50 m × 1.70 m (8 ft × 5 1/2 ft). The parallel bars are made of beech or maple wood and commonly number 7, 14, or 16 pieces.

The top bar is extended further than the other bars to facilitate exercises where the user hangs vertically. The bars are 40 mm thick and oval shape. An incline board or pull-up bar can be attached to the bars.

== Uses ==
The wall bars have many uses and are widely used in gyms and schools. They are used simply for climbing and for coordination skills, particularly in primary school education. They are also used by more advanced gymnasts for resistance training, flexibility training or abdominal exercises. Gymnasts can hang from a higher bar with their back facing the bar and perform abdominal exercises, or hang facing the bar to stretch their back. Wall bars are also useful for parkour training. They provide several different heights to jump to and provide an area from which to jump. For spine disorders such as scoliosis, it is advisable to consult an orthopedist before performing any exercises at the wall bars.
