= Backboard (tennis) =

Wall to allow tennis practice alone

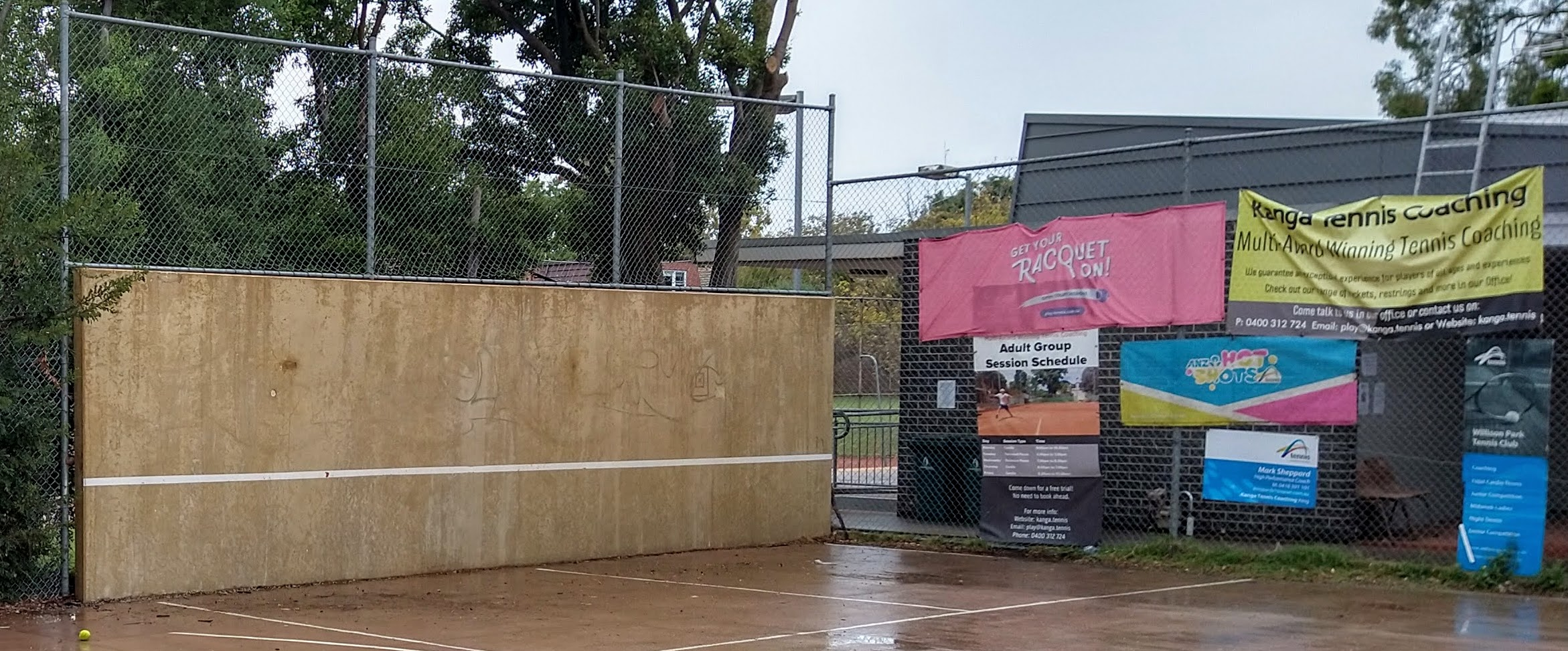
Willison Park hit-up wall

A tennis backboard or hit-up wall is a simple wall sometimes made from fiberboard and located at or near a tennis court or at a playground or park. It should have a tennis net either drawn or painted at the proper height of 3 ft 6 in. It is designed to allow a single person to practice by hitting a tennis ball against the wall so the ball is returned, much like a second player would return it. Its invention is credited to tennis player Mary Browne in 1926 during her tenure as a coach at the University of Chicago. The main advantage of the backboard is that it provides a realistic and challenging emulation of regulation tennis, while also being more enjoyable. In 1938 a restraining line was added so that players would not stand unrealistically close to the wall.

Many players are said to have been given their first basic strokes by playing for hours at public courts backboards. Though the backboard's death has been touted more than once, many still believe that it is an important tool to basic skill and stroke development. Including Roger Federer himself, with a "Backboard Challenge".

== See also ==
- Tennis court
