= Suspension training =

Approach to strength training

The term suspension training refers to an approach to strength training that uses a system of ropes and webbing called a "suspension trainer" to allow users to work against their own body weight.

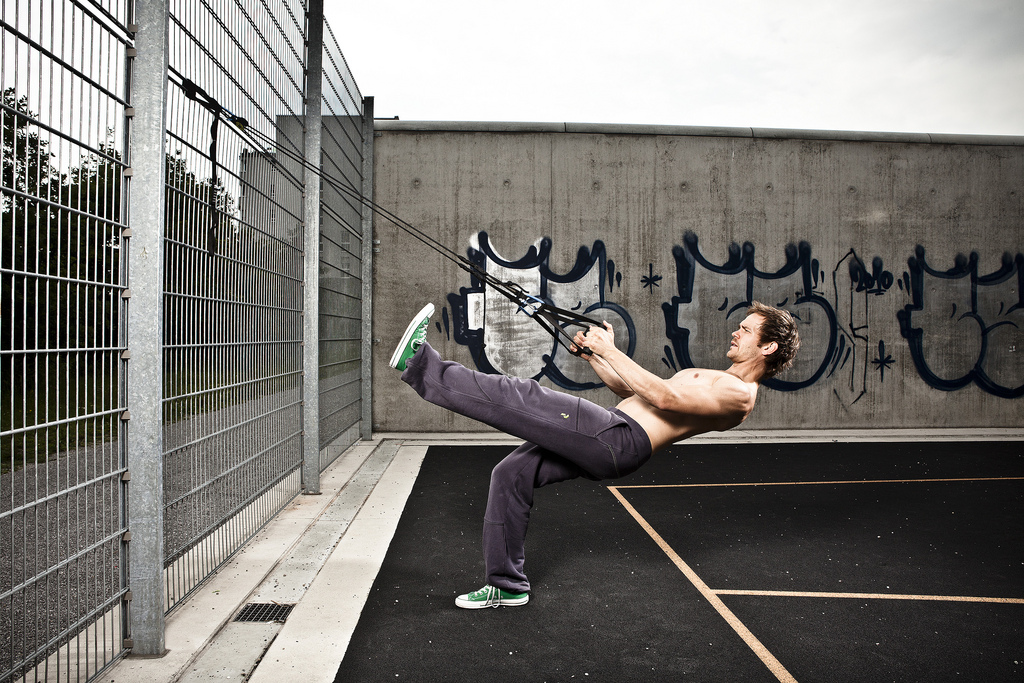
outdoor workout with a Sling Trainer

== Description ==
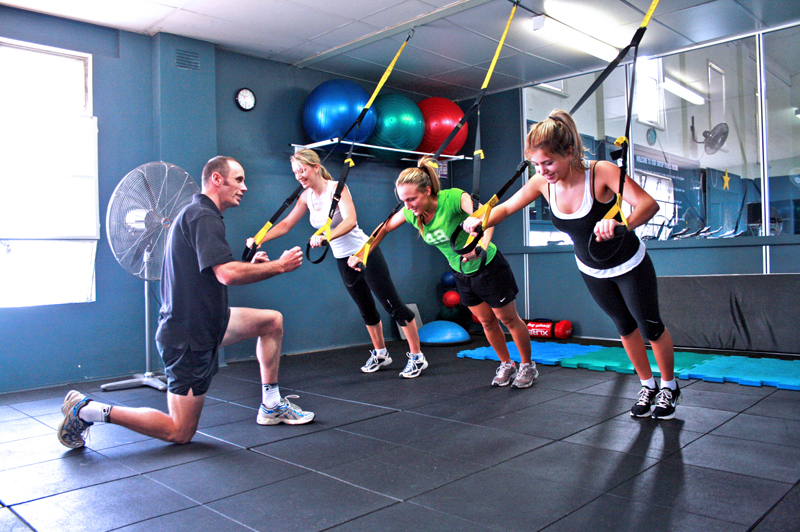
Group suspension training.

The field of suspension training is a form of resistance training that includes bodyweight exercises in which a variety of multi-planar, compound exercise movements can be performed. These are done with the aim of developing strength, balance, flexibility, and joint stability simultaneously. Suspension training develops physical strength while using functional movements and dynamic positions. The actual term "suspension training" is a trademark of Fitness Anywhere.

== History ==
Rope training has been around as early as the 1800s.

Randy Hetrick, a former Navy Seal and Stanford MBA graduate, developed the Total Resistance eXercise (TRX) equipment and the associated Suspension Training bodyweight exercises in the 1990s, and started marketing it in 2005. Kurt Dasbach, a former professional soccer player in Chile, developed a rival product, Inkaflexx. Inkaflexx has since closed shop, but TRX continues as a $60 million per year business.

In 2008, ex Bristol City F.C. fitness coaching team Mark Hammond and Pete Faulkner developed the FKPro two-strap system. In 2009 Fabio Martella MMA coaching wrote the first TRX technical manual in Italy. Another alternative is the aeroSling ELITE made in Germany. This "Suspended Pulley Trainer" also contains a pulley system. The Hook Isometrics/Suspension Trainer by Sierra Exercise Equipment enables the user to use it for either suspension training or isometrics training. Evolution has continued with TRX and other companies improving designs to minimize risk.

== Benefits and criticism ==
Proponents of suspension training argue that it develops core body strength, as well as joint and muscular stability, reducing the chance of injury. Some sports scientists have expressed concern that weaker individuals may not have the core stability or joint integrity to use the system safely and effectively.

== See also ==
- TRX System
