= TRX System =

Brand of suspension training equipment

Fitness Anywhere, LLC
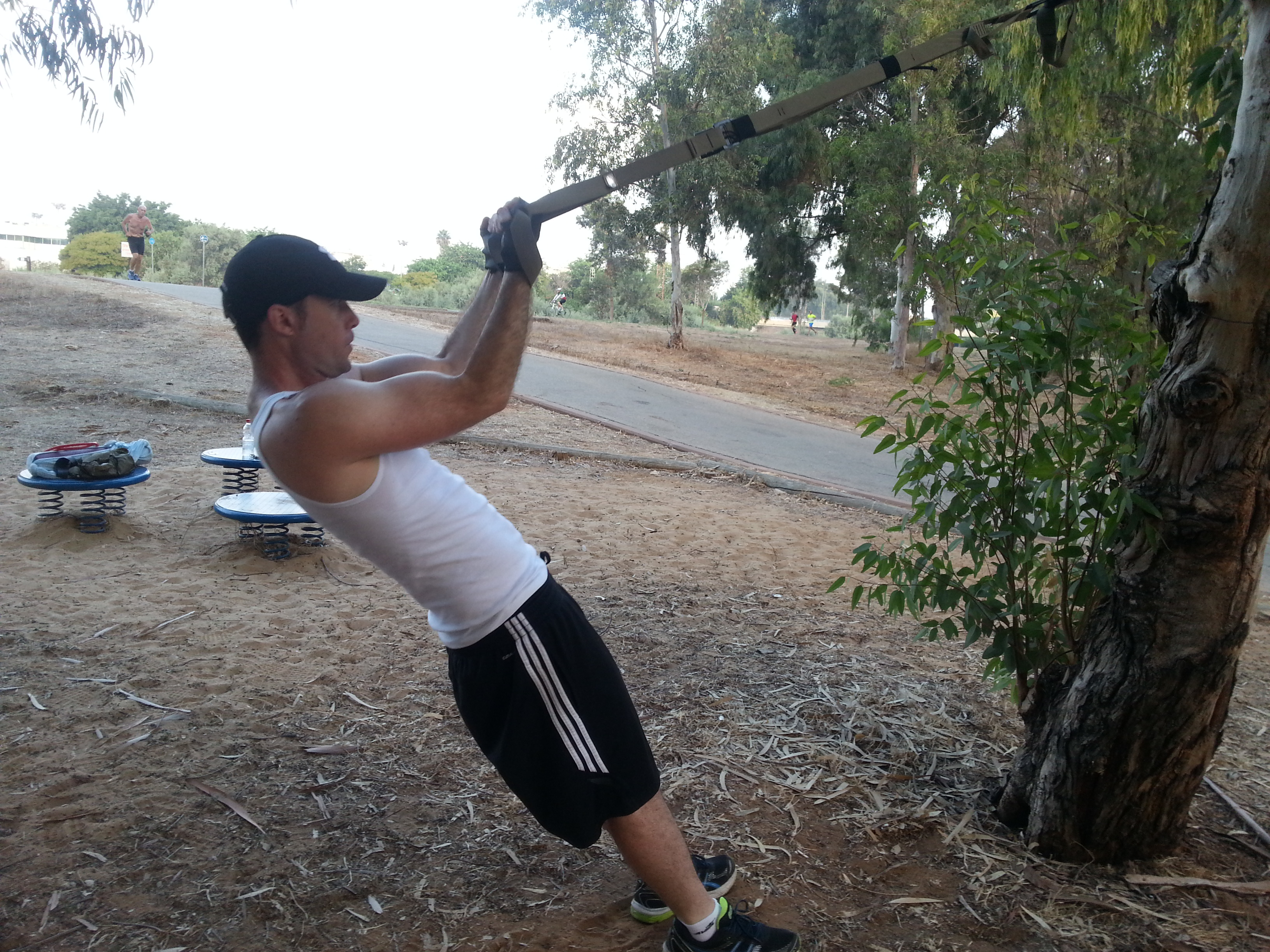
- A person using a TRX system anchored to a tree
- Company type: Limited liability corporation
- Genre: Fitness
- Founded: 2005
- Founder: Randy Hetrick
- Headquarters: San Francisco, USA
- Products: TRX Suspension Trainer and TRX Rip Trainer

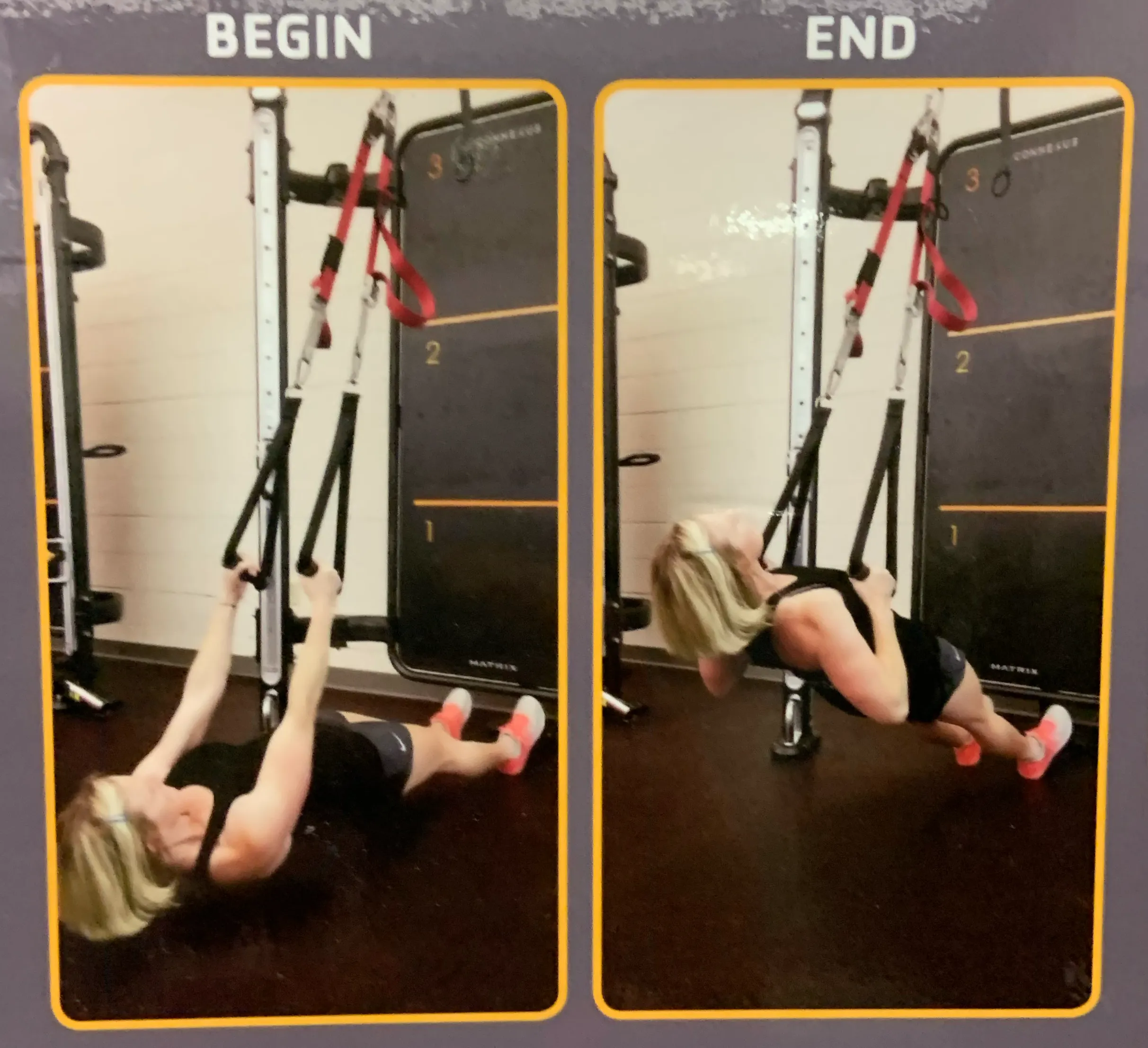
TRX bands Inverted row

The TRX System, also known as Total Resistance Exercises, refers to a specialized form of suspension training that utilizes equipment developed by former U.S. Navy SEAL Randy Hetrick. TRX is a form of suspension training that uses body weight exercises to develop strength, balance, flexibility and core stability simultaneously. It requires the use of the TRX Suspension Trainer, a performance training tool that leverages gravity and the user’s body weight to complete the exercises. TRX's designers claim that it draws on research from the military, pro sports, and academic institutions along with experience gathered from the TRX designers themselves.

== History ==
In 2001, after 14 years as a SEAL Hetrick left the Navy and attended Stanford University where he earned his MBA. Hetrick first established his TRX system at the Krav Maga Fitness Club in San Francisco with US$350,000 from private investors who he met through connections via Stanford and the military.

On June 8, 2022, TRX filed for Chapter 11 bankruptcy, blaming declining sales after the COVID-19 pandemic from increased competition from other fitness brands. The company listed itself for sale and would seek a buyer during the bankruptcy procedure. TRX continued to operate and sell its products normally during the bankruptcy procedure. On August 29, 2022, TRX was acquired by founder and former CEO Randy Hetrick out of bankruptcy.

== Alleged benefits and criticism ==
Supporters of TRX Training claim that it can improve mobility and stability, increase metabolic results, build lean muscle, and develop functional strength. However, some analysts worry that the instability of suspension straps could possibly result in injury, especially for those with a history of joint or back injuries, or inadequate core strength. Fabio Comana, a research scientist at the nonprofit American Council on Exercise, states that suspension training may work for well-conditioned athletes and gym-goers who regularly train their core, however, it is potentially dangerous for those who haven’t built up their core.
