= StreetStrider =

Fitness equipment company

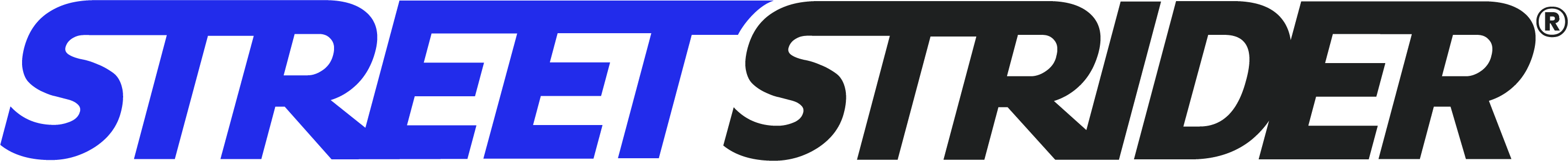
- The first 2-in-1 Indoor + Outdoor Elliptical
- Company type: Private
- Industry: Elliptical trainer
- Founded: 2007
- Key people: Dr. David Kraus (co-founder and president); Garrett Watkins (co-founder and CEO)
- Products: Elliptical bicycles
- Brands: StreetStrider
- Website: streetstrider.com

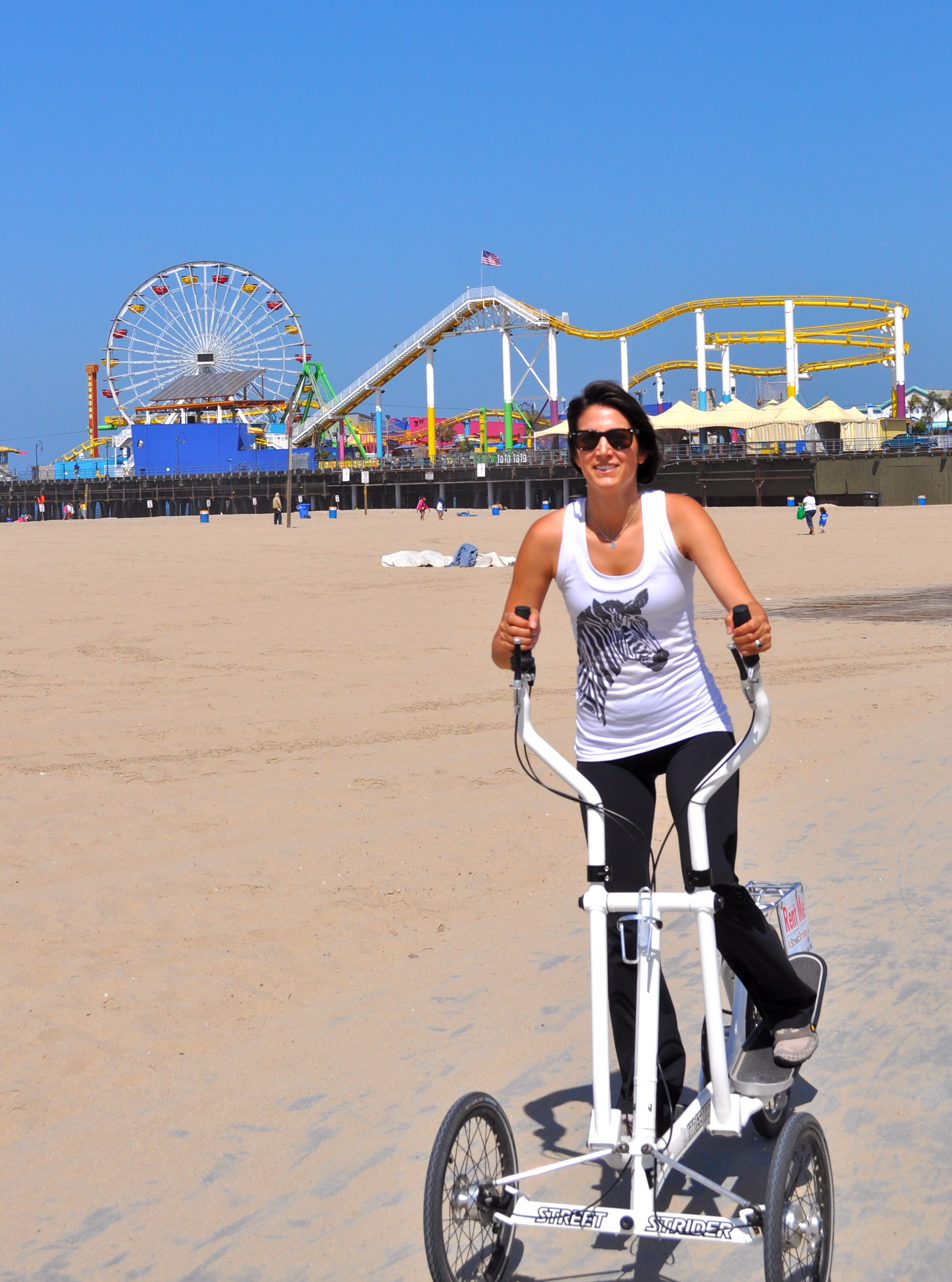
A StreetStrider used in mobile configuration.

StreetStrider is the brand name for a mobile elliptical trainer. It was developed by David W. Kraus, who wrote the patent for the device. The StreetStrider duplicates the motion of a stationary elliptical trainer in a mobile device. The rider achieves a full-body weight-bearing low-impact high-cardiovascular workout while moving outdoors. With a branded trainer stand, adult StreetStrider models can be fashioned into stationary elliptical trainers, enabling indoor use during inclement weather. The StreetStrider can be used for physical fitness, weight loss, physical therapy, human-powered transport, and outdoor adventure.

The StreetStrider consists of a T-shaped lower frame to which two front wheels and a rear wheel containing a drive assembly are attached, and an upright frame to which two reciprocating arm levers are attached. Two elongated foot platforms on either side of the lower frame are attached to cranks as part of the drive assembly, which, as with bicycle drivetrain systems, also includes a hub, a rotating axle, and an internal hub gear system translating the axle rotation to the hub. The StreetStrider drive assembly is either chained or chainless direct drive, depending on model. The lower end of each arm lever is attached to the front end of each foot platform, which, by connection in the rear to the rotating crank arm and in the front to the pivoting arm lever, moves generally in an elliptical path. The device also includes a leaning mechanism for steering, as well as brakes and multiple gearing.

== See also ==
- ElliptiGO
- Elliptical trainer
