= City slicker =

City slicker or City Slickers may refer to:

== Movies ==
- The City Slicker, a 1918 film starring Harold Lloyd
- City Slickers, a 1991 comedy movie
  - City Slickers II: The Legend of Curly's Gold, the 1994 sequel to City Slickers
- City Slickers Can't Stay With Me: The Coach Bob Larsen Story, a 2015 American documentary

== Groups ==
- Spike Jones & His City Slickers, an American popular music band in the 1940s and 1950s
- Oklahoma City Slickers, two former association football (soccer) teams in Oklahoma City

== Other uses ==
- City Slicker, a 2021 EP by Ginger Root
- "City Slickers", a financial column which appeared in the Daily Mirror during the 1990s
- "City Slickers", a season 3 episode of The Loud House

== See also ==
- Slicker (disambiguation)
