= Leila Senemar =

Iranian bodybuilder

- لیلا سنمار
- Born: May 4, 1977 (age 48)
- Citizenship: Iran
- Years active: 1992 - present
- Known for: The first lady an international fitness judge in Iran

Leila Senemar (Persian: لیلا سنمار; born on May 4, 1977) is the first woman who was able to become an international fitness judge in Iran.

== Early life and amateur career ==
Leila Senemar started playing volleyball at the age of fifteen. After three years of activity, due to the ban on women's competitions in Iran, she had to change her major and turned to bodybuilding. After some time passed and considering that there was no training for women and the bodybuilding federation was not formed, she pursued this sport professionally by taking help from external and internal sources and completing her information in the field of health and bodybuilding and at the same time, she practiced MMA, which was taught underground by trainers, and after passing coaching classes at the international level in the field of bodybuilding, nutrition, physical fitness, cross training and martial arts, she succeeded in receiving a certificate in 2021, the first certificate of fitness judgement for women in Iran. She went to the official matches of Spain with the national team as an official referee, was the only player of the Iranian team who, in addition to her history of frequent trips abroad, was not issued a visa for unknown reasons, about which some Iranian media discussed.

== Her support for Iranian women in sports ==
In one of her interviews, she supported women's rights in Iran and said that restrictions should not prevent women from playing professional and competitive sports.

== Spanish visa ==
The Spanish Embassy did not issue a visa to Leila Senemar for an unknown reason.
