= City Slickers Can't Stay With Me: The Coach Bob Larsen Story =

- Directed by: Robert Lusitana
- Written by: Robert Lusitana
- Produced by: Robert Lusitana
- Starring: Bob Larsen; Meb Keflezighi; Deena Kastor; Alberto Salazar; Steve Lewis (sprinter); Thom Hunt
- Cinematography: Jeff Durkin
- Edited by: R.L. Shontell
- Music by: Andreas Bamberger; Dylan Berry; Smash Haus; Richard Lauw; Stefan Litrownik
- Production company: Extant Media
- Release date: April 19, 2015 (Boston Marathon)
- Running time: 113 minutes
- Country: United States
- Language: English

City Slickers Can't Stay With Me: The Coach Bob Larsen Story, or simply City Slickers Can't Stay With Me, is a 2015 documentary directed by Robert Lusitana that recounts the 50 + year career of USATF National Track and Field Hall of Fame Coach Bob Larsen from his beginnings as a high school coach through his years as UCLA Bruin Track and Field coach culminating with his work with Mammoth Track Club and Meb Keflezighi

== Plot ==
The plot line of the film combines a chronological documentation of the 50+ year career of National Track and Field Hall of Fame Coach Bob Larsen with his current day work with long-time protégé, Meb Keflezighi. The narrative toggles between historical segments and glimpses into the training of an elite marathon champion. Along the way viewers learn about the success Larsen has had at all levels – high school, junior college, UCLA, the elite club level where he worked in tandem with Coach Joe Vigil to create Mammoth Track Club, and are introduced to Meb's story and learn about the commitment and dedication needed to achieve at world class levels. The film has some wonderful old photos and super 8 footage from the 70's in addition to some scenic footage of Mammoth Lakes, CA. It culminates with Meb's inspirational victory in the 2014 Boston Marathon (the year after the bombing occurred).

== Cast ==
- Bob Larsen
- Meb Keflezighi
- Deena Kastor
- Alberto Salazar
- Steve Lewis (sprinter)
- Thom Hunt

== Release ==
The film debuted April 19, 2015 at the Boston Marathon, followed by a limited theatrical release in various cities including New York, Los Angeles, San Diego, San Francisco, and Eugene. The film was released and is available on VOD starting in 2017.

== Reception ==
The New York Times wrote "From the 1960s through the '90s, Larsen presided over fantastically successful programs at all levels" and "Many world-class runners praise Larsen's low-key, laconic style and share stories, but the film frames its narrative around Larsen's close relationship with Meb Keflezighi" as well as "The director, Robert Lusitana, who ran for Larsen himself, has assembled a touching celebration of a coach and mentor"

The Orange County Register praised the film by writing "New film captures the essence of Bob Larsen's coaching style" .

The Los Angeles Times wrote "it doesn't take a track-and-field fanatic to admire an educator who gears toward individual needs to bring out the best in each pupil and make a difference in every life".
