= Slackers (disambiguation) =

A slacker is a person who procrastinates or is lazy.

Slacker may also refer to:

== Entertainment ==
=== Movies ===
- Slacker (film), a 1991 American independent comedy-drama movie
- Slackers (film), a 2002 American romantic comedy movie

=== Music-related ===
- Slacker (producer) (Shem McCauley; died 2012), British electronic music producer
- Slacker rock, a loosely defined genre of indie rock and lo-fi music
- The Slackers, a ska musical group from New York City formed in 1991
  - The Slackers (album), their self-titled debut album

=== Other uses ===
- Slacker, a 2016 book by Gordon Korman
- Slacker Radio, an online radio station launched in 2007, acquired in 2017 by LiveOne

== Other uses ==
- Slacker, a person who uses or advocates use of the Slackware distribution of the Linux operating system
- Slackers CDs and Games (founded 1993), an entertainment retailer

== See also ==
- Slack (disambiguation)
- Slacklining
- Slicker (disambiguation)
