= Treadle bicycle =

Historical bicycle powered by a treadle

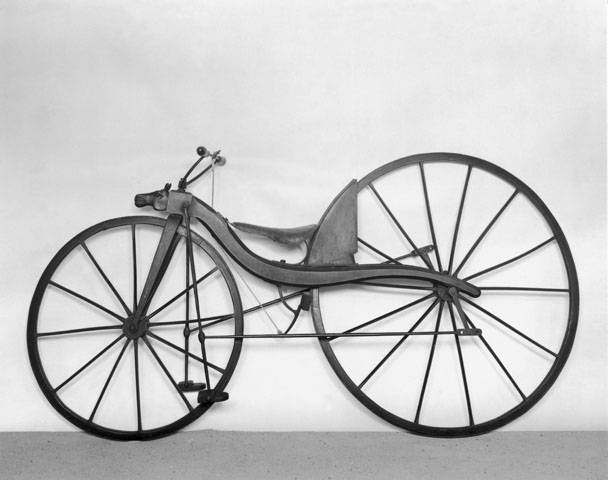
A (probably later imitation) MacMillan bicycle, probably made c.1860

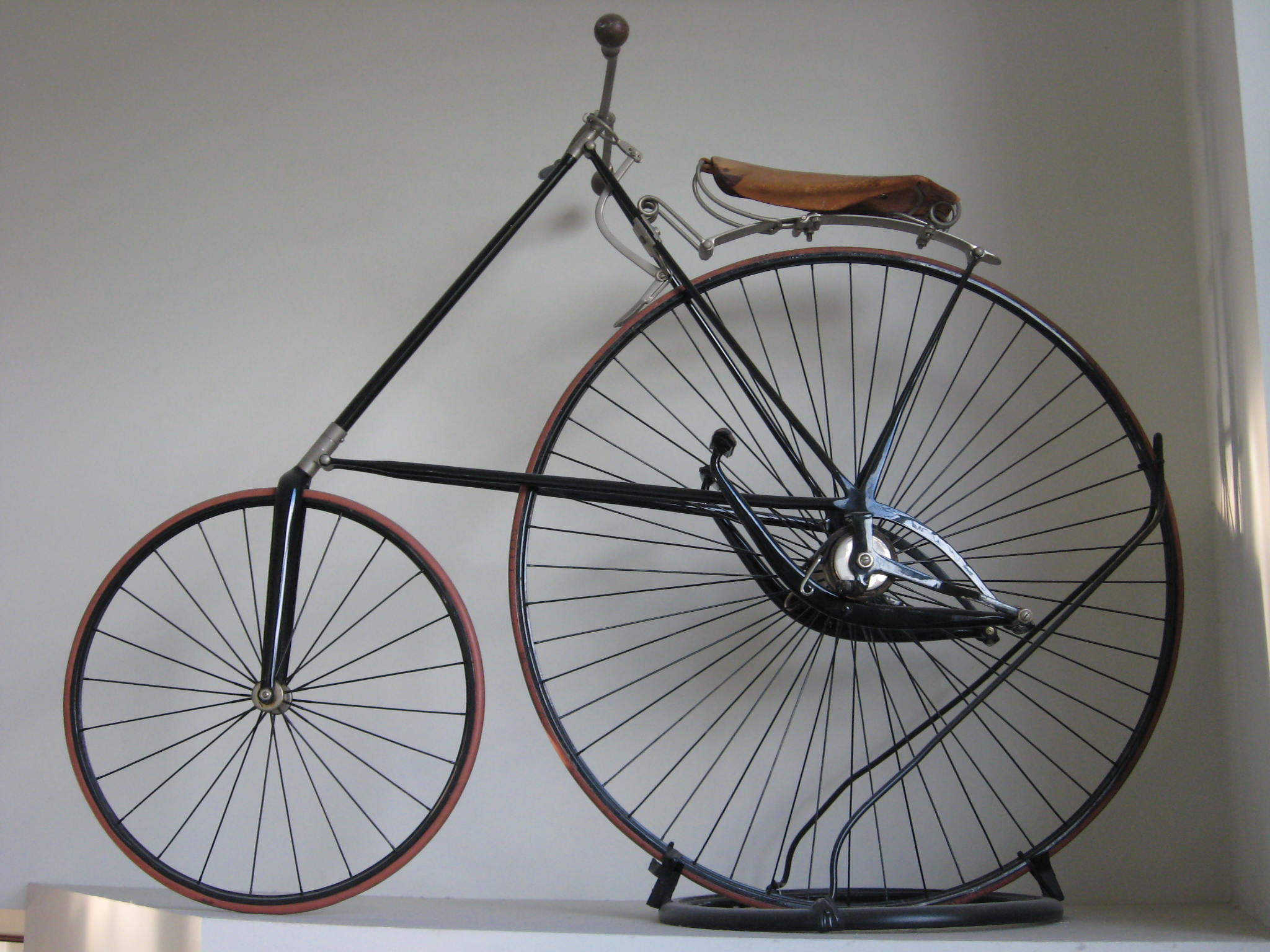
An American Star Bicycle

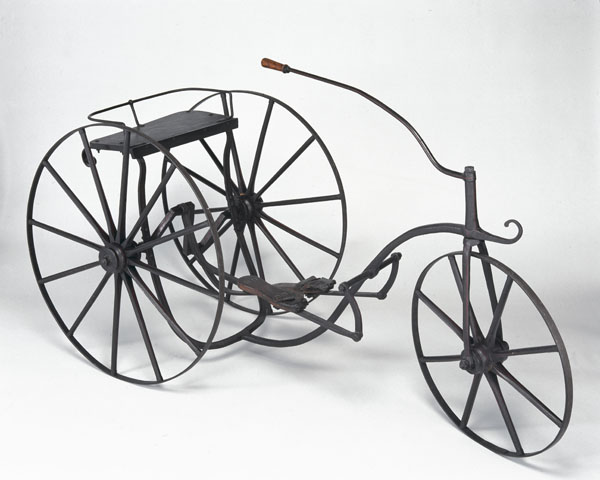
A treadle-driven tricycle

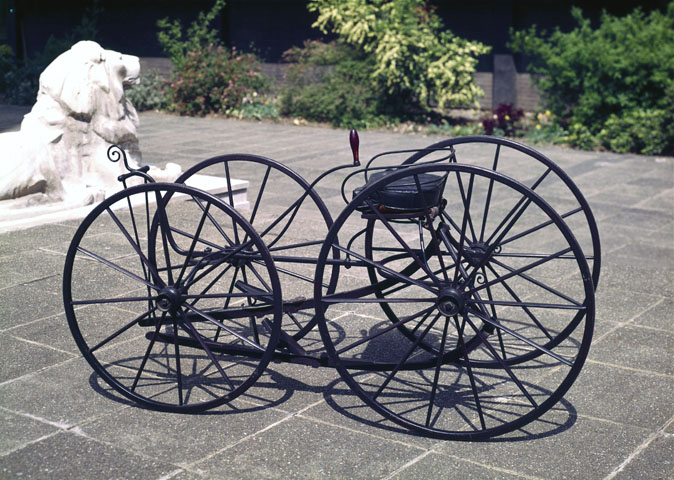
A treadle-driven quadracycle

A treadle bicycle is a bicycle powered by a treadle instead of the more common crank. Treadles were one of the mechanisms inventors tried in order to position the pedals away from the drive wheel hub before the development of the bicycle chain or instead of it. Treadles have also been used to drive tricycles and quadracycles.

== History ==
Treadles were used before the advent of highwheelers on Thomas McCall's velocipede, on highwheelers themselves in an attempt to address safety issues, on alternative configurations of highwheelers, and on the first device called a safety bicycle by British engineer Henry J. Lawson in 1876. Some inventors even combined treadles and chains on the same bicycle.

== Gallery ==
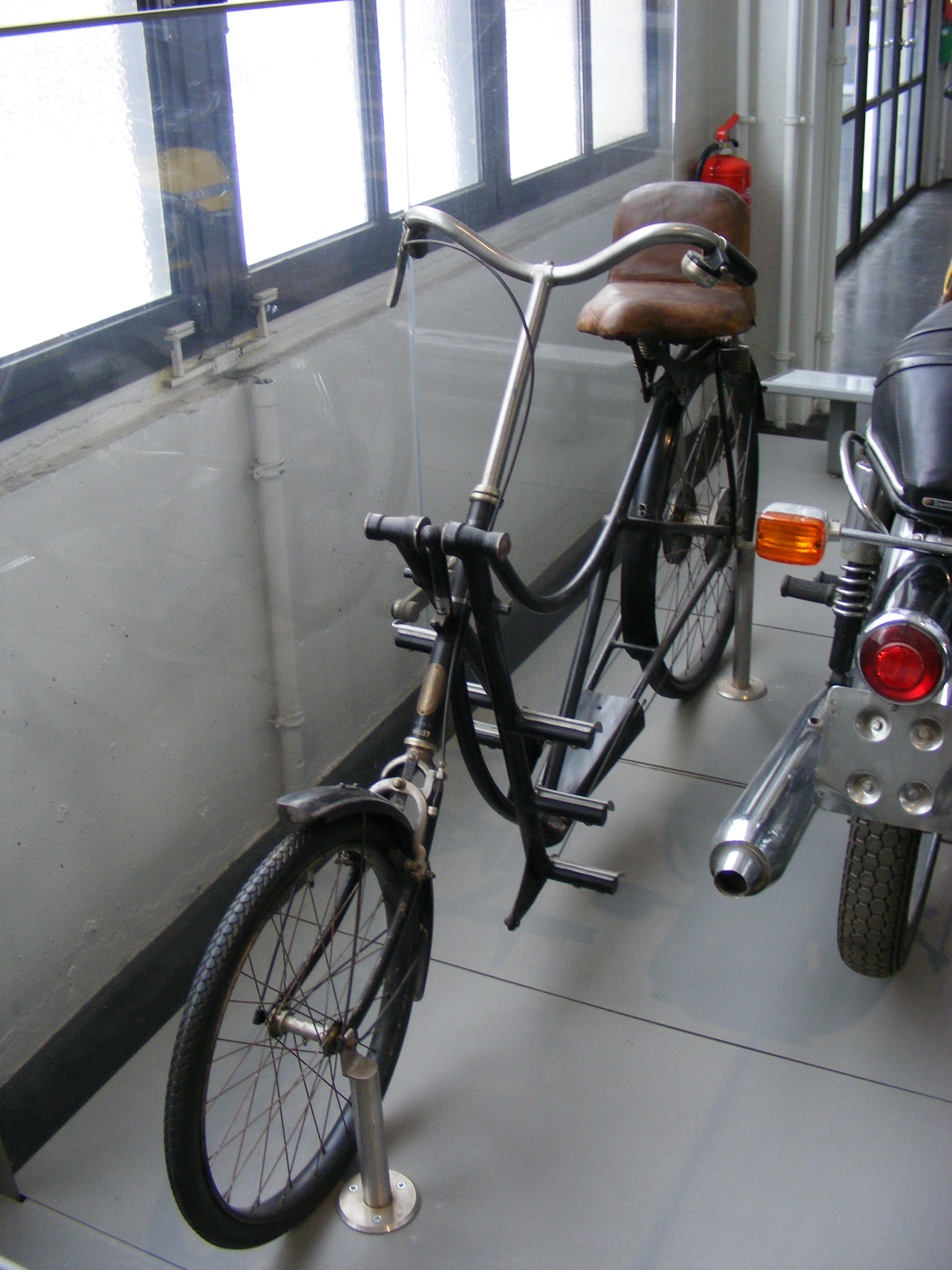
A treadle bicycle from 1925

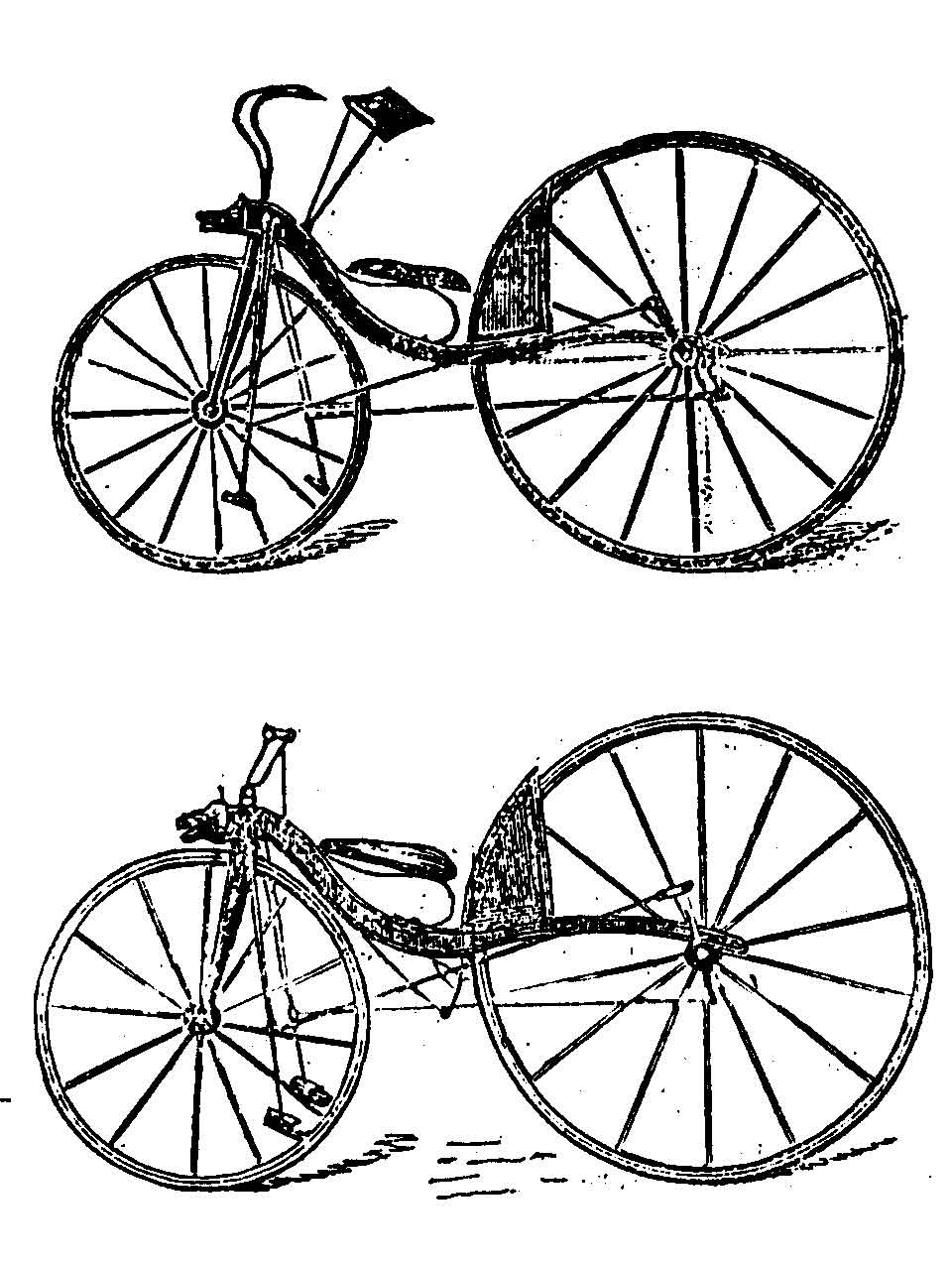
McCall's first (top) and improved velocipede of 1869, later predated to 1839 and attributed to MacMillan

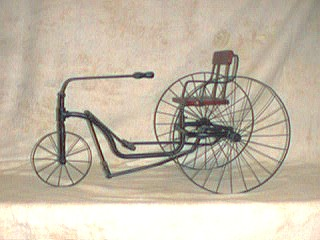
Velocipede from 1880

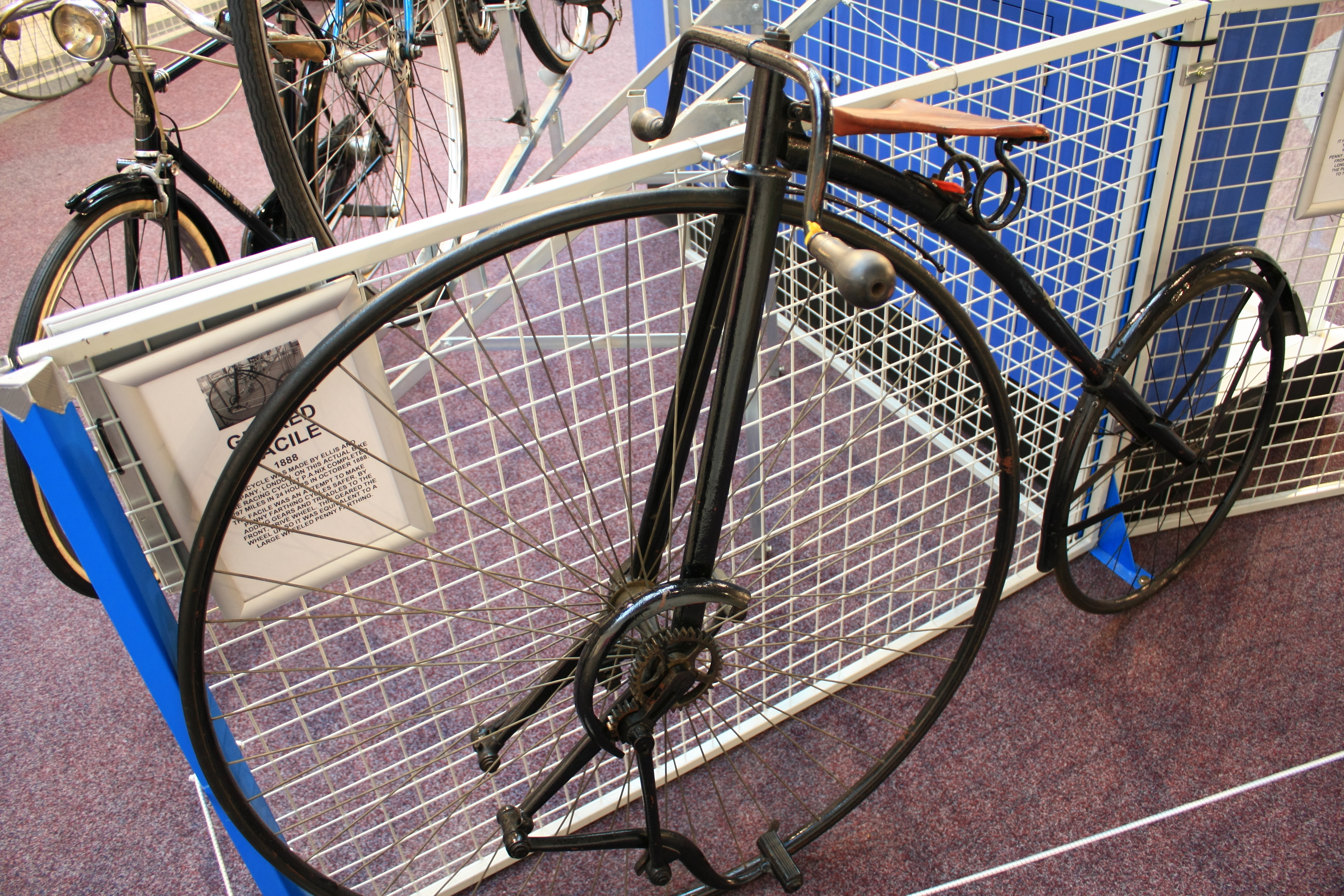
1888 Geared Facile Bicycle in the Coventry Transport Museum

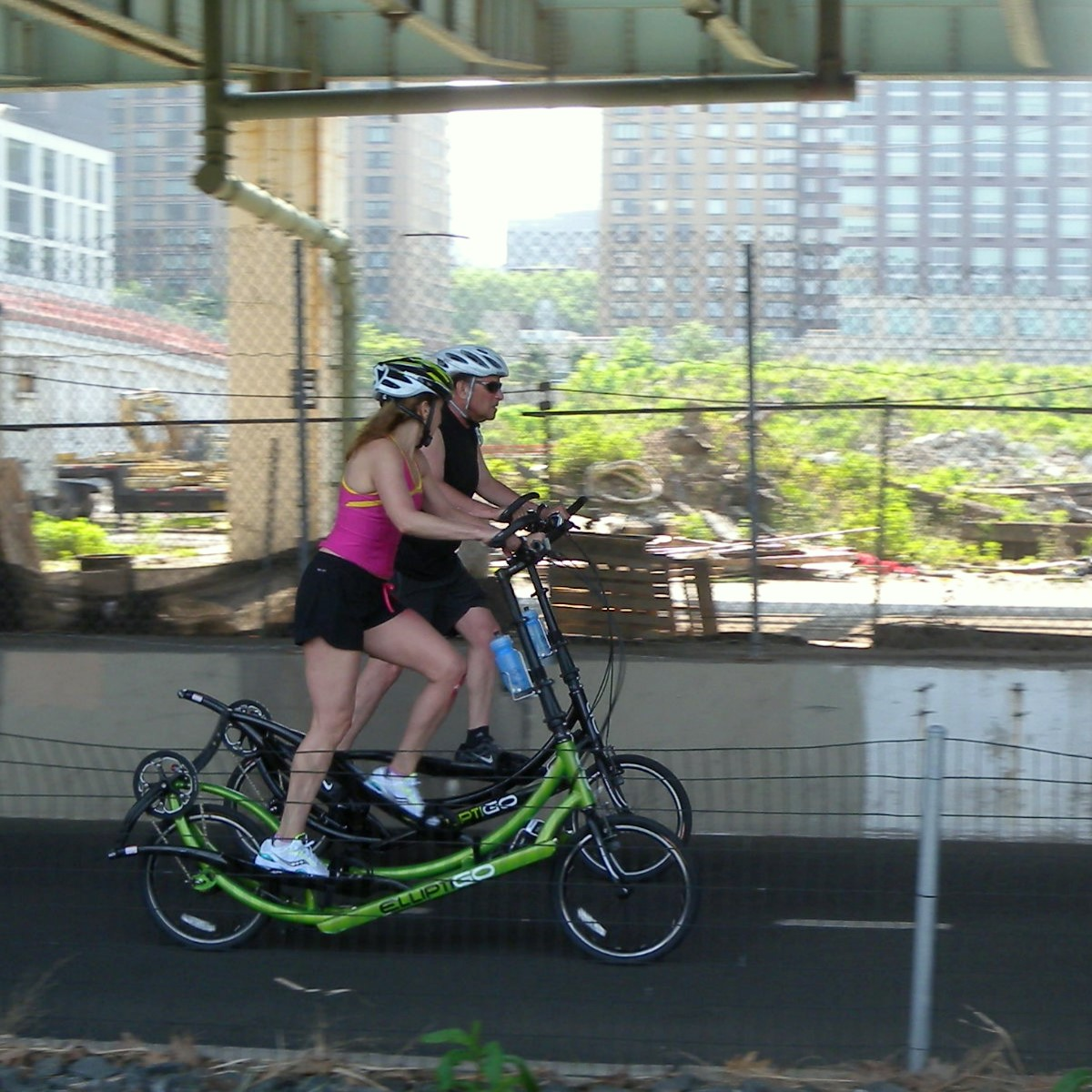
A modern ElliptiGO seatless treadle bicycle modeled after elliptical trainers

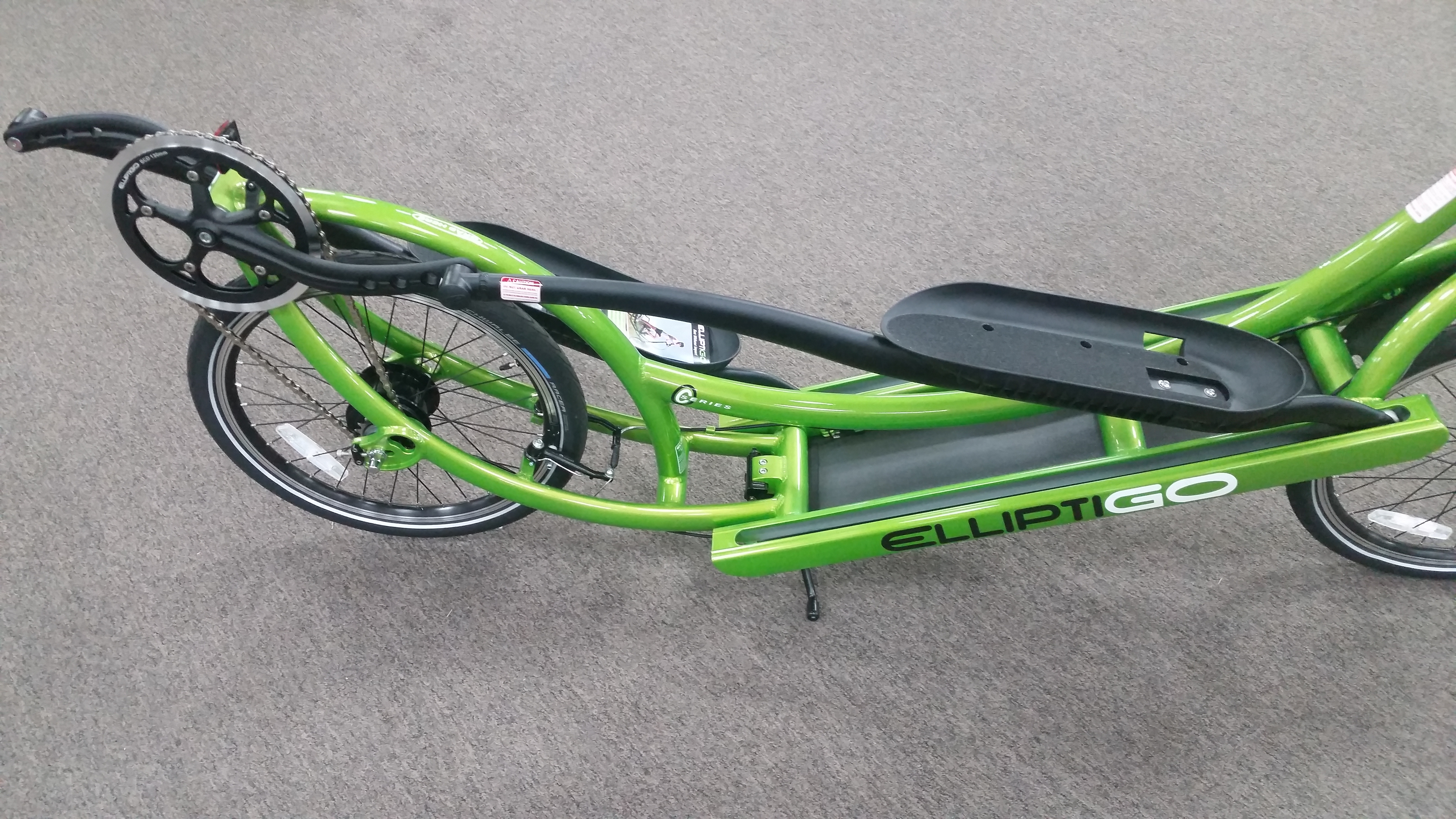
Close-up of the Elliptigo drive chain.

== See also ==
- Outline of cycling
- Types of bicycles
