= Elliptical trainer =

Stationary exercise machine

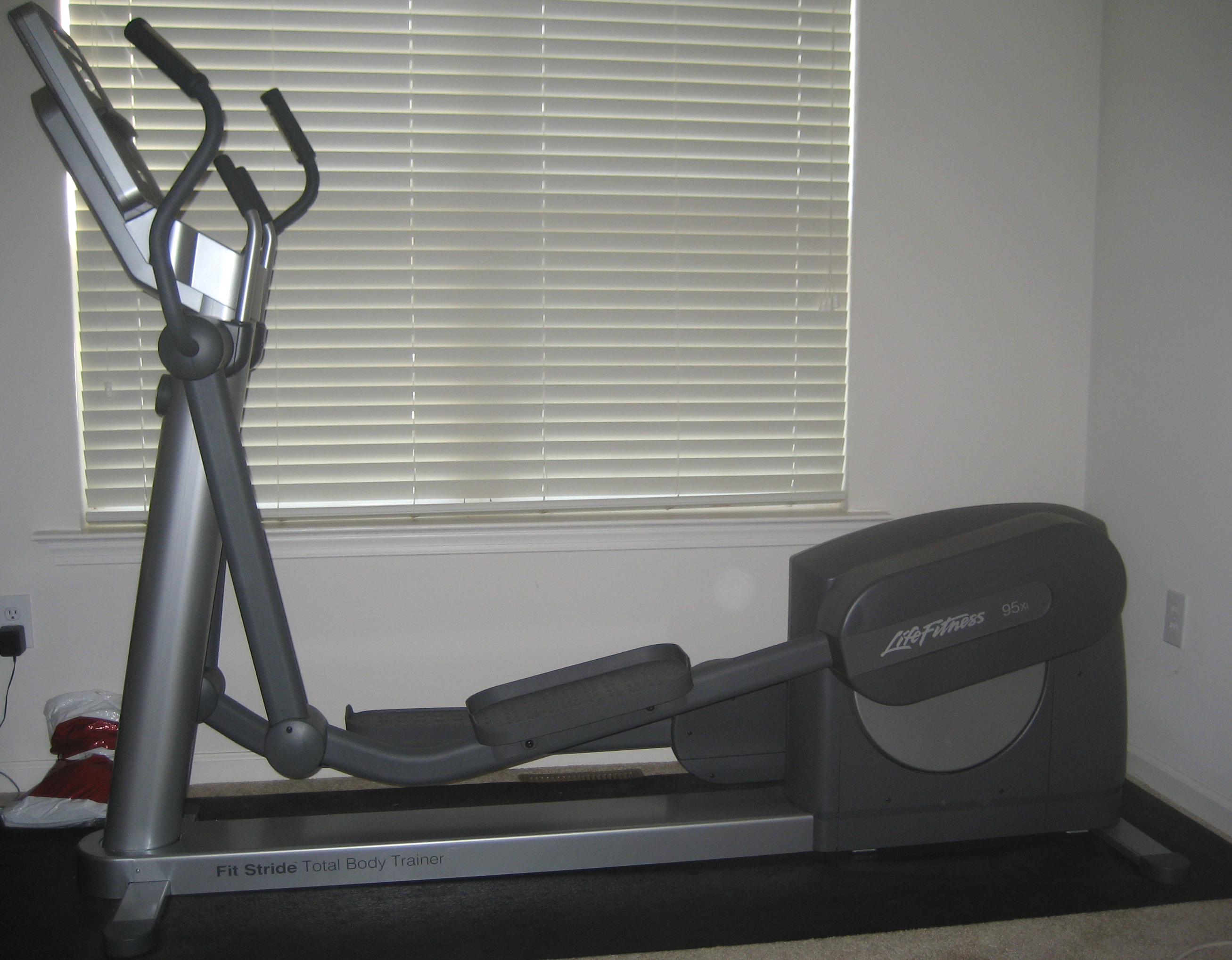
Commercial elliptical trainer (rear drive version)

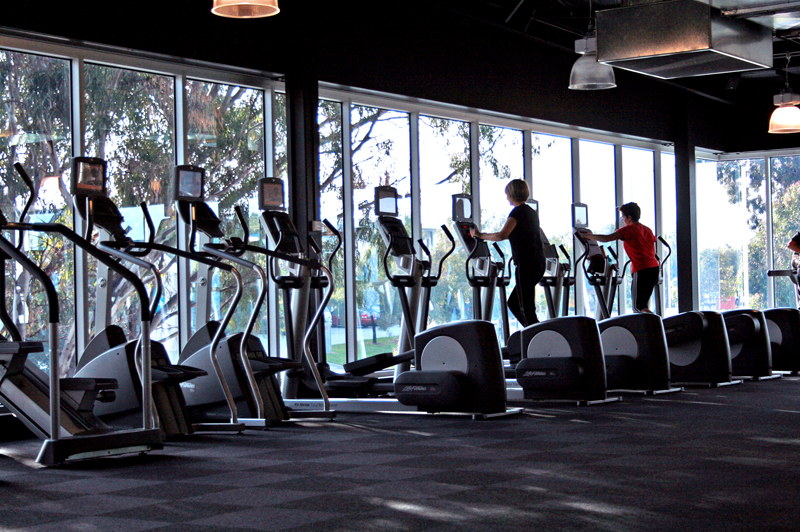
Row of elliptical trainers at a gym

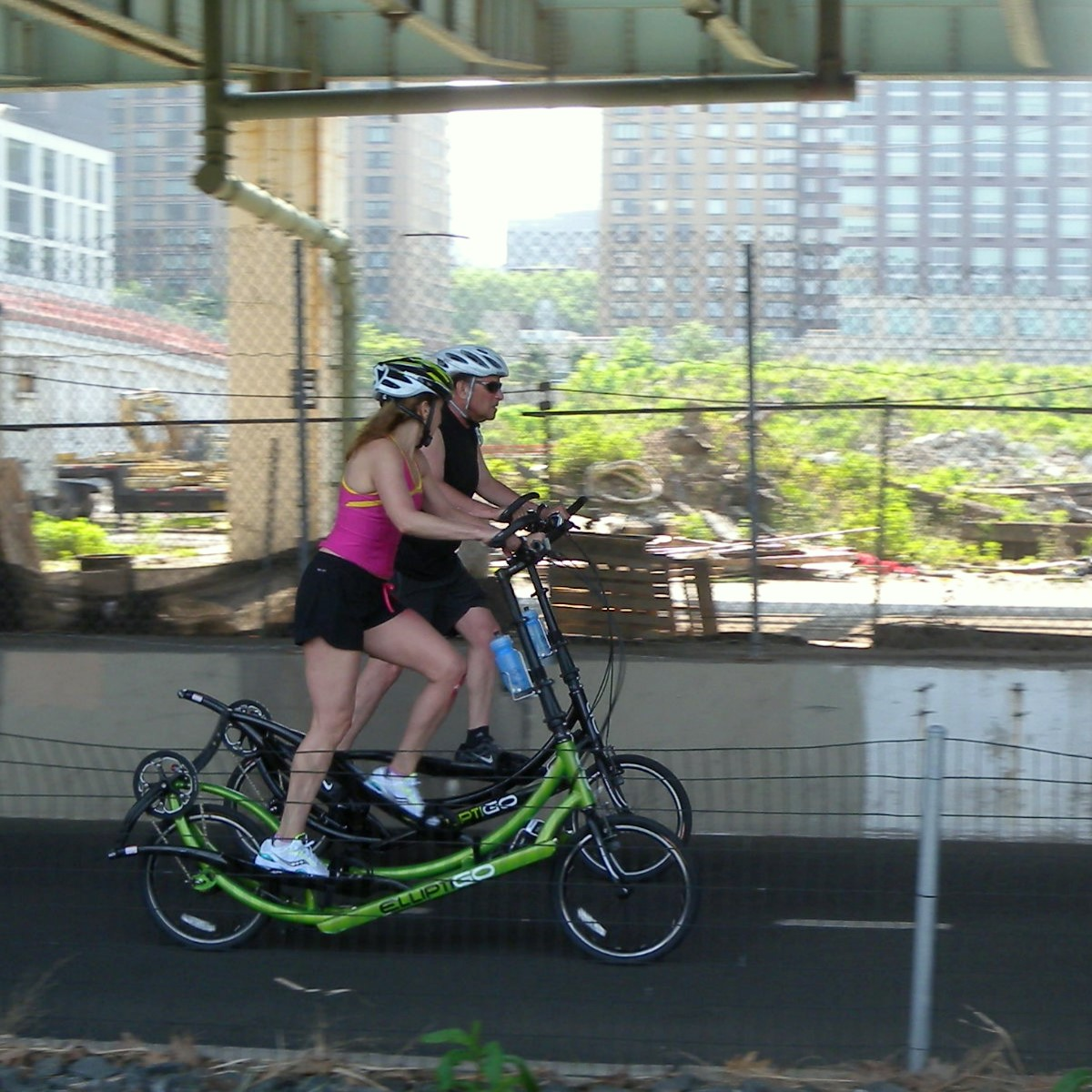
ElliptiGO trainers are elliptical but not stationary.

An elliptical trainer or cross-trainer is a stationary exercise machine used to stair climb, walk, or run without causing excessive pressure to the joints, hence decreasing the risk of impact injuries. For this reason, people with some injuries can use an elliptical to stay fit, as the low impact affects them little. Elliptical trainers offer a non-impact cardiovascular workout that can vary from light to high intensity based on the speed of the exercise and the resistance preference set by the user.

Elliptical trainers first entered the market in the 1990s, invented by Precor.

Most elliptical trainers work the user's upper and lower body (although some models do not have moving upper body components). Though elliptical trainers are considered to be minimal-impact, they are an example of a weight-bearing form of exercise. They can be self-powered by user-generated motion or need to be plugged in for adjustment of motion and/or for supplying their electronic consoles and resistance systems.

== History ==
Elliptical riders use an arrangement of links known to the kinematics community as four-bar linkage. The pedals are attached to the floating link referred to as the coupler. The first published work on the subject of elliptical path generation is given in 1988 by researchers at Purdue University in which the path of a point on the floating link is shown to approximately follow an elliptical shape. In 1995, Precor introduced the Elliptical Fitness Crosstrainer (EFX), the first piece of exercise equipment to allow the foot to roll from heel to toe just like in running. Its patented mechanism weds a rear flywheel with a forward foot pedal, creating a smooth, elliptical movement. This is key to foot comfort and reduces numbing of the foot experienced on other stationary cardio equipment.

This approach is classified as "low impact" as it keeps a person's heels in contact with the pedals, reducing muscle and tendon stress.

Gregory Feeder sold the first Precor Elliptical in 1995 in Lynnwood, Wa for Exercise Equipment Center. The machine was called the Transport back then. Precor Headquarters was located in adjacent Bothell, Wa. They sent a prototype unit to the local dealer's closest store. As the unit was being assembled a customer who worked at nearby Boeing Inc. had multiple questions about the machine. When the unit was complete, Feeder offered the customer a test drive. The sale was closed and the start of the Elliptical began. The unit name was changed from Transport to EFX because of a name conflict with Pontiac who had a minivan named Transport.

== Types ==
There are three types of elliptical trainers, categorized by the location of the motor or "drive." The oldest elliptical design is the "rear drive" type, the second generation elliptical design is the "front-drive" type, and the most recent elliptical design is the "center-drive" type.

On some models, the incline of sloping roller-ramps beneath the pedal-links can be adjusted to produce varying pedal-motion paths. An adjustable ramp, whether automatic or manual, alters the angle of the elliptical path which can vary hip actuation as well as vary the stride length. This can allow a user to alter their workout to target various lower body muscles. In addition to the lower body, elliptical workouts are known to target the whole body. While mostly targeting the glutes, hamstrings and calves, ellipticals can also target the core, triceps, biceps and shoulders depending on the workout. Some elliptical trainers even enable exercisers to use preset programs to automatically vary incline, resistance, and stride length over the course of a workout. In addition, some elliptical trainers can be driven in either a forward or a reverse direction.

Elliptical trainers are primarily driven by the user's legs. Most models are combination designs. They feature handle-levers attached to each pedal-link. This design allows the arms to bear some of the load and provides a secondary source of driving power. In order to push and pull the arms and move the feet back and forth in elliptically formed paths the user grasps the handles below shoulder height. Thus the oscillating handle-motions are dependent on – and coordinated with – the constrained pedal-motions. Some poorly designed machines are too dependent on the user's leg power, producing excessive handle speeds due to mechanical ratios that do not provide enough mechanical advantage to the handle-levers. Consequently, such machines might feel to the user as if their arms are simply "going along for the ride" rather than performing a meaningful portion of the work. Better models of elliptical trainers offer a more balanced – or even harmonious – combination of arm and leg exercise in useful, proper ratios.

Some manufacturers produce durable commercial models made to withstand frequent use in a fitness club environment, at prices that can be in excess of $4,000. Inexpensive models are available for home use at prices starting around $200. More expensive elliptical trainers – especially commercial machines – are more likely to offer more features such as extensive programs and better adjustment options.

== Benefits ==
An elliptical cross trainer is comparable to a treadmill in its exertion of leg muscles and the heart. Ellipticals produce an intermediate range of leg motion between that of stationary bikes and treadmills.

In a 2010 study, 9 males and 9 females were chosen to exercise at the same RPE on the treadmill or elliptical and found that energy expenditure and oxygen consumption were the same in the two forms of exercise equipment. Thomas Altena, a professor of nutritional and exercise physiology at the University of Missouri, measured oxygen retention, lactic acid build-up, heart rate, and perceived rate of exertion to compare treadmills and elliptical trainers, finding that the "physiological responses associated with elliptical exercise were nearly identical to treadmill exercise". However, it is important that the resistance set on the elliptical machine is at a relatively high setting, depending on the user.

Since users do not take their feet off the pedals, there is no footfall noise, which is in contrast with other fitness trainers such as treadmills.

A 2002 study by the University of Idaho shows that varying the stride length on the elliptical trainer can activate a wider range of muscle groups. The study also showed that as the stride is lengthened, more calories are burned without any higher rate of perceived exertion by the user. The findings of this study support the claims made regarding the changeable stride length function feature on some newer ellipticals.

== Common usage ==
While procedures differ slightly between models, most follow a similar approach: the user stands comfortably with a straight back, aligning knees, hips, and ankles, and distributing weight evenly between the heels and the balls of the feet. Holding the handrails, the user moves in a smooth, controlled forward or reverse motion, maintaining a natural and continuous stride.

== See also ==
- Cross-training
- ElliptiGO
- StreetStrider
- Treadle bicycle
- Weight training
