= Meb Keflezighi =

Eritrean-born American long-distance runner (born 1975)

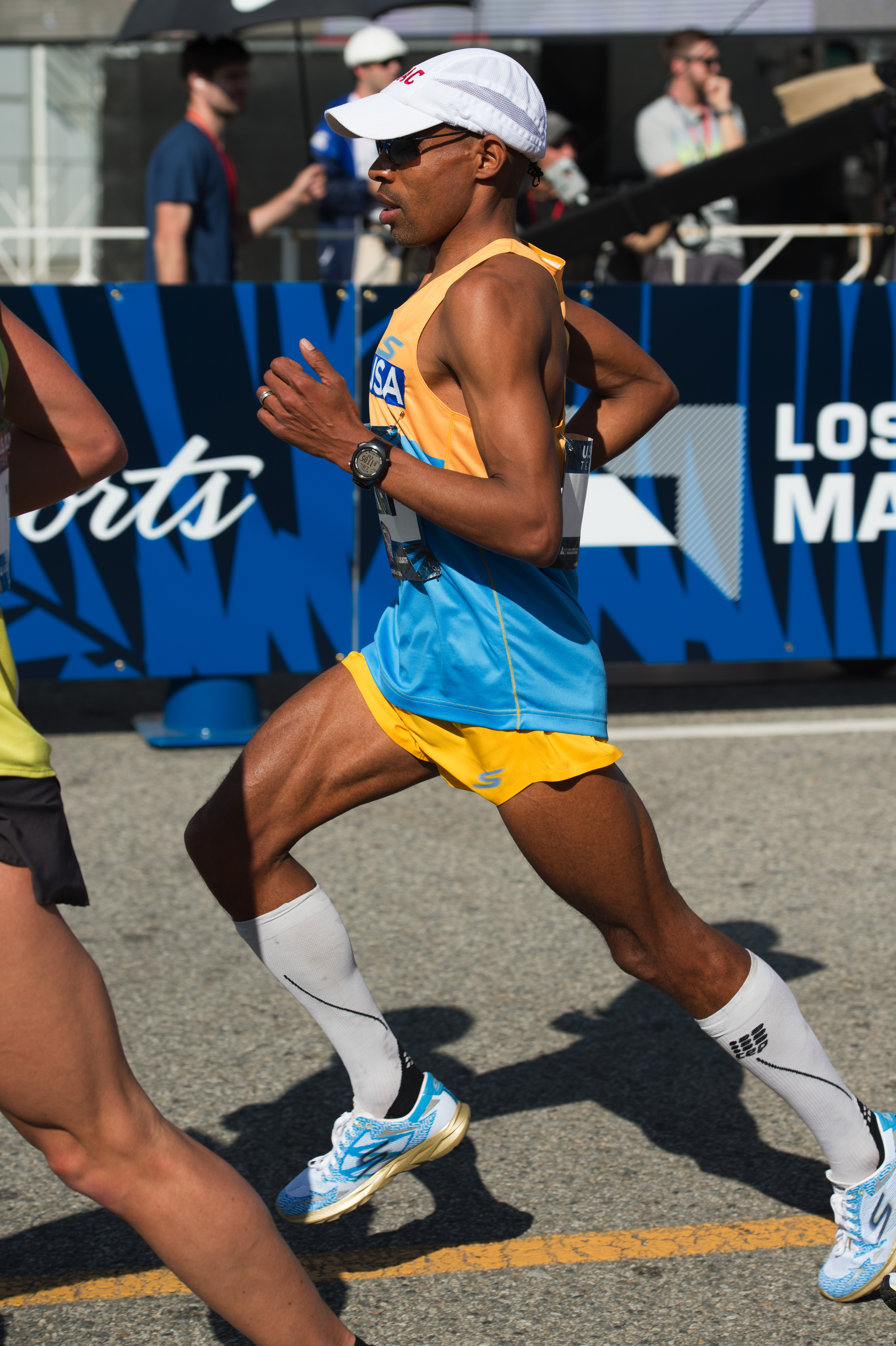
- Meb Keflezighi at the 2016 Olympic Team Trials

Personal information
- Nationality: American
- Born: May 5, 1975 (age 51) Asmara, Ethiopia
- Height: 5 ft 5 in (165 cm)
- Weight: 127 lb (58 kg)
- Website: http://www.marathonmeb.com/

Sport
- Country: United States
- Events: Marathon, 10,000 m
- College team: UCLA Bruins
- Club: New York Athletic Club
- Coached by: Bob Larsen
- Retired: Nov. 2017

Achievements and titles
- Olympic finals: 2000 Sydney; 10,000 m - 12th; 2004 Athens; Marathon - Silver; 2012 London; Marathon - 4th; 2016 Rio de Janeiro; Marathon - 33rd
- World finals: 2001 Edmonton; 10,000 m - 23rd; 2003 Paris; 10,000 m - 16th
- National finals: NCAA cross-country NCAA 10,000 m (outdoors); NCAA 5,000 m (indoors); NCAA 5,000 m (outdoors)
- Personal bests: Outdoor; 1500 m: 3:42.29; Mile: 4:02.79; 5000 m: 13:11.77; 10,000 m: 27:13.98; Road; Half marathon: 1:01:00; Marathon: 2:08:37
Medal record
Representing United States
Olympic Games
Silver medal – second place	2004 Athens	Marathon
World Cross Country Championships
Bronze medal – third place	2001 Ostend	Team
World Marathon Majors
Gold medal – first place	2009 New York City	Marathon
Gold medal – first place	2014 Boston	Marathon
Silver medal – second place	2004 New York City	Marathon
Bronze medal – third place	2005 New York City	Marathon
Bronze medal – third place	2006 Boston	Marathon

Mebrahtom "Meb" Keflezighi (/ˈmɛb kəˈflɛzɡi/; Tigrinya: መብራህቶም ክፍለዝጊ, Mebrāhtōm Kifl'izgī; born May 5, 1975) is a retired American long distance runner. He is the 2004 Olympic silver medalist in the marathon and finished in fourth place in the 2012 Summer Olympics. He won the 2009 New York City Marathon on November 1, 2009, and the 2014 Boston Marathon on April 21, 2014, becoming the first American man to win each race since 1982 and 1983, respectively. Keflezighi is a graduate of UCLA, where he won four NCAA championships competing for the UCLA Bruins track and field team. He came in fourth in the 2014 New York City Marathon on November 2, 2014, eighth in the 2015 Boston Marathon on April 20, 2015, and second in the 2016 U.S. Olympic Team Trials to qualify for the 2016 Summer Olympics.

== Competition record ==
=== Marathons ===
Competition	Rank	Time	Location	Date	Notes
2004 Summer Olympics	2nd	2:11:29	Athens, Greece	2004 Aug 29	1st US medal since 1976

== Early life and education ==
Keflezighi and his family were refugees from modern-day Eritrea (then part of Ethiopia), who came to the United States via Italy in 1987. He is one of ten children.

Keflezighi began running while a student at Memorial Academy in San Diego, where he ran a 4:07 mile before going on to win both the 1600 meters and 3200 meters at the CIF California State Championships in 1994 for San Diego High School. Keflezighi became a naturalized citizen of the United States in 1998 – the same year in which he graduated from UCLA. While at UCLA Keflezighi received numerous All-American awards and other accolades. He won four NCAA championships (the 5k and 10k outdoor and 5k indoor) during the 1996–97 season, including the cross-country title, spanning from the track and field season in the spring to the cross country season in the fall.

He was inducted into the UCLA Athletics Hall of Fame in 2010.

== Career ==
Keflezighi is a three-time national champion in cross country running, having won the USA Cross Country Championships in 2001, 2002 and 2009.

His fastest times for some standard distances are 3:42.29 for 1500 m, set in 1998; 13:11.77 for 5000 m, set in 2000; 27:13.98 for 10,000 m, set in 2001 (an American record which stood until 2010); and 2:08:37 for the marathon, set at the 2014 Boston Marathon.

On October 11, 2010, he released his autobiography, Run to Overcome, which was published by Tyndale House Publishers. The book, co-authored with noted sports writer Dick Patrick, included recollections about major milestones in his life, such as his Olympic competitions and other running highlights, as well as his early years, leading up to the present day. He is also the driving force behind the MEB Foundation, the "MEB" standing for "Maintaining Excellent Balance," which principally promotes healthy living, and other positive lifestyle choices and motivation for school-age youth.

Despite his success, Keflezighi's sponsor Nike did not renew his long-running contract in 2011. As a result, Keflezighi competed as an unsponsored athlete. In December 2011, Keflezhigi was signed up by sportswear company Skechers, whom he has represented since. In 2013, Keflezighi signed with elliptical cycling company ElliptiGO. Other current sponsors in 2014 include PowerBar, Sony, Oakley, Inc., Garmin, USANA Health Sciences, Generation UCAN, CEP Compression, New York Athletic Club, and KRAVE Jerky.

On April 21, 2014, Keflezighi became the first American man to win the Boston Marathon since 1983, besting many of the heavy African favorites in a new personal best of 2:08:37. With this victory, Keflezighi became the only Marathoner in history to win the Boston Marathon, the New York City Marathon, and an Olympic Medal.

At the end of 2014, Keflezighi was selected for the Jesse Owens Award as the USATF Athlete of the Year.

=== 2004–2009 ===
2004

- In the 2004 Summer Olympics, Keflezighi finished second in the men's marathon, behind Italian runner Stefano Baldini winning a silver medal in a personal season's best time of 2 hours, 11 minutes and 29 seconds. He finished 42 seconds ahead of Brazilian Vanderlei Cordeiro de Lima, who was leading the marathon until being pushed off the course by protester Neil Horan. This was the first medal won by an American man in the Olympic marathon since Frank Shorter won the gold in the 1972 Summer Olympics and took the silver medal in the 1976 Summer Olympics in Montreal, Quebec, Canada.

2007

- Keflezighi broke his hip during the 2008 U.S. Olympic Marathon trials in Central Park. He finished in eighth place and did not qualify for the team. During the race, his friend and training partner Ryan Shay died of a heart attack.

2009

- He won the 2009 New York City Marathon, setting a personal best of 2:09:15. Keflezighi was the first American to win the marathon since 1982.

=== 2010–present ===
2010

- On April 19, 2010 he ran his third fastest time of 2:09:26 while finishing 5th in the 114th Boston Marathon, despite training at half his usual mileage with a knee injury. He ran with the leaders for much of the race, before slowing at the finish.
- He ran the San Jose Half Marathon as part of his preparation towards a New York title defense and he comfortably won by a margin of three minutes, finishing in 1:01:45.
- He ran a PR in the 2010 New York Marathon of 2:09:13, placing sixth place and the first U.S. finisher.

2012

- On January 14, 2012, he won the U.S. Olympic Marathon Trial in Houston with a time of 2:09:08, which was a new personal best by 5 seconds. He is the oldest winner of the Olympic Trials Marathon at age 36.
- On August 12, 2012, Keflezighi finished fourth in the 2012 Summer Olympics Marathon with a time of 2:11:06.

2013

- On June 22, 2013, Keflezighi finished second in the US Half marathon Championships held around Duluth, Minnesota in 1:01:22.

2014

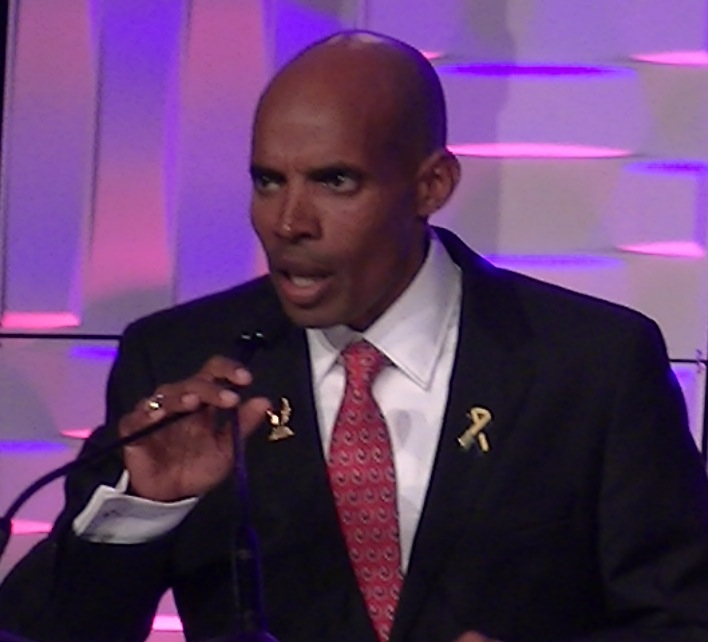
Meb Keflezighi accepting the 2014 Jesse Owens Award

- On January 19, Keflezighi won the USA Half Marathon Championships in a time of 1:01:23.
- On April 21, he won the 2014 Boston Marathon, the first American male to do so since 1983, and first American since 1985, with an official time of 2:08:37. The race was two weeks before his 39th birthday, making him the oldest winner of the Boston Marathon since at least 1930.
- On July 4, he ran in the Kilometer Kids Charity Chase, a part of the AJC Peachtree Road Race, in order to raise funds for the Atlanta Track Club's youth running program.
- On November 2, Keflezighi finished 4th in 2:13:20 at the 2014 TCS New York City Marathon.
- At the end of the season USATF selected his Boston victory as the Inspirational Performance of the Year. Later at the same ceremony, he was selected as the winner of the 2014 Jesse Owens Award.

2015

- On April 20, he came in eighth place in the 2015 Boston Marathon, crossing the finish line hand-in-hand with elite female runner Hilary Dionne.
- In May 2015, Keflezighi marked his Masters debut with a 1:02:29 at the Suja Rock 'n' Roll San Diego Half Marathon, which also served as the U.S. Masters National Championships. His time earned him the national title, and a second place overall finish.
- On November 1, he came in seventh place in the 2015 TCS NYC Marathon with an official time of 2:13:32; beating the former U.S. Masters Record by 20 seconds.

2016

- On 13 February 2016, Keflezighi placed second at the US Olympic Marathon Trials, finishing in 2:12:20, one minute behind Galen Rupp, on a warm day in Los Angeles.
- On August 21, 2016, Keflezighi finished 33rd in the 2016 Summer Olympics Marathon with a time of 2:16:46 after dealing with stomach problems in the second half of the race and stopping 7 times. He slipped right before the finish line but turned it into push ups.

== Training ==
Keflezighi uses nine-day training cycles instead of traditional training weeks, which he says allows him to concentrate on training while also allowing himself to recover. His training is composed of tempo runs, intervals, long runs and cross-training. In the weeks leading up to the 2014 Boston Marathon, he ran 2–3 times a day, and used his ElliptiGO for 10–20 mile cross-training rides to avoid injuries. Additionally, he tries to keep himself healthy with daily core-strengthening exercises, stretching, altitude training, tune-up races, and a high-protein diet with 5 servings of fruit.

== Products ==
- In 2011, Sony released a special-edition Meb Keflezighi 2GB W Series Walkman MP3 Player. It came pre-loaded with audio tips, along with a booklet containing tips on running, nutrition, stretching and more. The product is now discontinued.
- On October 15, 2013, Skechers debuted the limited-edition GOmeb line of athletic shoes, which features the official shoe of Keflezighi, the GOrun Speed. The line commemorates his wins in both the 2009 New York City Marathon and 2014 Boston Marathon.
- On July 2, 2014, a limited-edition 'Meb 8S' ElliptiGO was released to commemorate his 2014 Boston Marathon victory. The bike features his motto "Run To Win" and his signature, along with a patriotic-themed paint job.

== Personal life ==
Keflezighi lives and trains in Tampa, where he moved in 2019 from his long-time home in San Diego. Keflezighi also previously trained in Mammoth Lakes, California, and is a member of the New York Athletic Club.

Keflezighi is represented by his brother Merhawi, who as a UCLA undergraduate was a student manager for the Bruin men's basketball team (head student manager in 2001–02) and is a 2006 graduate of the UCLA School of Law. Keflezighi and his wife Yordanos married in November 2004 and have three daughters: Sara, Fiyori, and Yohana.

Keflezighi is a Catholic.

Keflezighi was recognized as an Outstanding American by Choice by the United States Citizenship and Immigration Services in 2017.
