= Bob Larsen =

American track and field coach (born 1939)

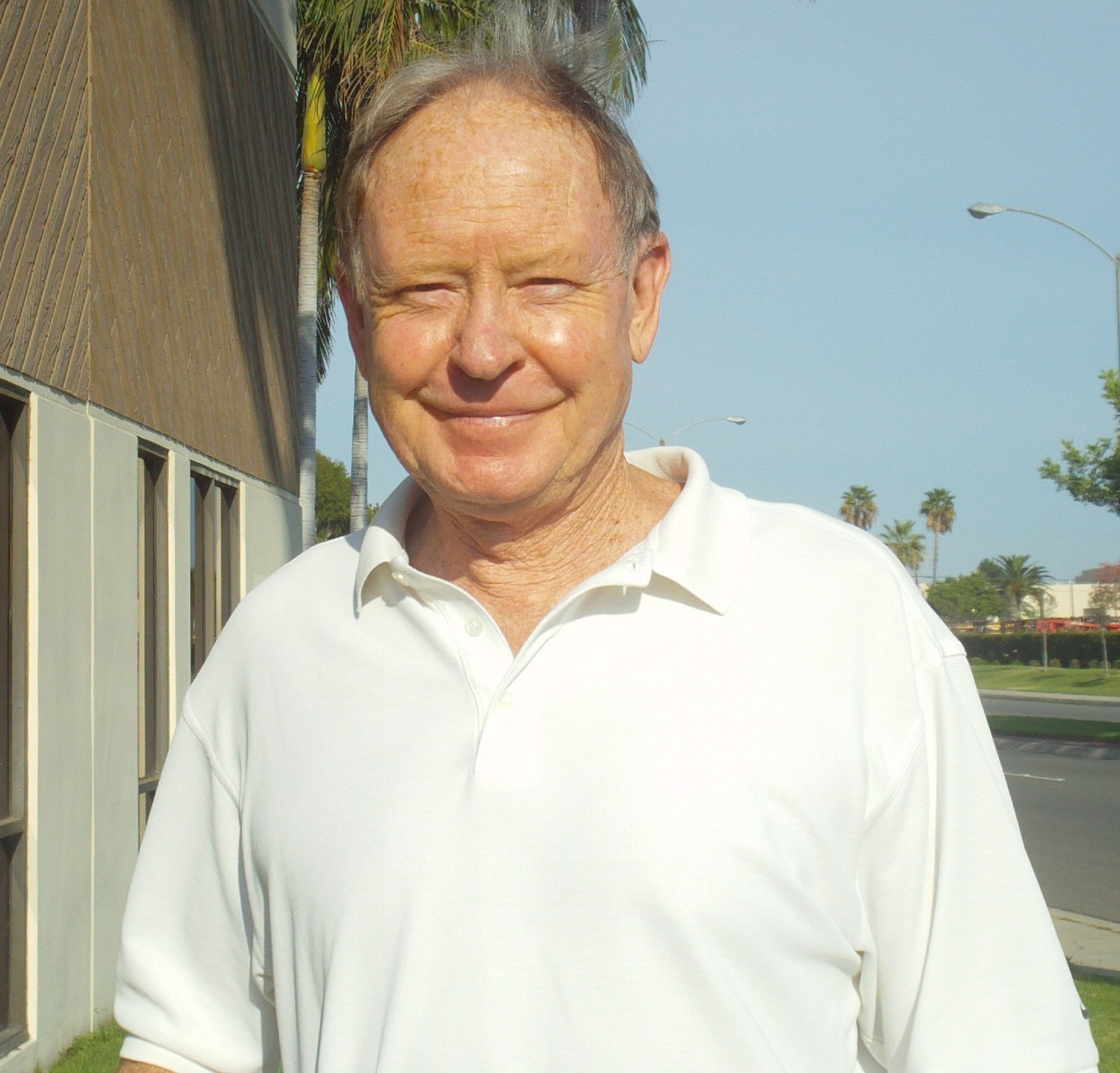
- Larsen in 2012
- Born: January 23, 1939 (age 87)
- Occupation: Track and field athletics coach

Bob Larsen (born January 23, 1939) is a Hall of Fame Track and field athletics coach, known largely for coaching distance runners, though he has had success coaching across a full range of events. His most notable athlete is Mebrahtom Keflezighi, the 2004 Olympic silver medalist in the marathon. Building on that success, Keflezighi won the men's division of the 2009 New York Marathon, and the 2014 Boston Marathon. Previous to that Larsen coached the UCLA cross country and then track teams between 1979 and his retirement in 1999.

== Career ==
After graduating from San Diego State College in 1961, Larsen started in the 1960s at Grossmont College, where he led the Griffins (now defunct) team to seven state titles and nine consecutive conference titles. During his tenure, his distance runners set 11 national community college records. Larsen was elected to the California Community College Cross Country and Track Coaches Association Hall of Fame in 1996. At the same time, Larsen formed and coached the Jamul Toads running team, which won the AAU National Cross Country Championship in 1976. At Monte Vista High School in Spring Valley, California, Larsen's team went undefeated for three years.

Starting with a lackluster UCLA cross country program, his first season in 1979 was the first time UCLA had ever qualified for the NCAA National Championships. Larsen was selected National Coach of the year 1980, the first of four such selections. Under him, UCLA won two Pac-10 men's cross country titles and made six appearances at the NCAA Championships.

In 1984, Larsen succeeded Jim Bush as UCLA Head Track and Field Coach. He perpetuated the UCLA winning ways with two consecutive NCAA Men's Outdoor Track and Field Championships in 1987 and 1988, along with nine conference championships. Among the athletes on those championship teams were Olympic gold medalists Steve Lewis, Danny Everett and Kevin Young. Other athletes on Larsen's teams included Ato Boldon, John Godina, Henry Thomas, Michael Granville and Keflezighi. UCLA also finished a close second place in 1995.

In 1995 he was named the Coach of the Year by the United States Track Coaches Association. In 2003 he joined that organization's Hall of Fame. In 2005, he was given the Bill Bowerman Award from the National Distance Running Hall of Fame, sponsored by Nike.

On December 5, 2009 Larsen was awarded the Robert Giegengack Award, signifying the person who has "made an outstanding contribution to the development and success of USA Track & Field and the larger community of the sport."

On August 5, 2010, Larsen was named co-chairman of the USATF Coaches Registry Task Force.

Larsen is the subject of a full-length documentary, City Slickers Can't Stay With Me: The Coach Bob Larsen Story, released April 19, 2015.

He is currently a coach at the Mammoth Lakes Mammoth Track Club high altitude training camp.

In 2019, Larsen was awarded the accolade of the USA Track & Field Legend Coach Award.
