= Slicker (disambiguation) =

Slicker is an alternate term for a raincoat.

Slicker may also refer to:

== People ==
- Slicker Parks (1895–1975), American baseball player
- Cieran Slicker (born 2002), British footballer
- George Slicker (fl. 1995), Irish rugby league footballer
- Mick Slicker (born 1978), British rugby league footballer

== Other uses ==
- City slicker (disambiguation)
- Slicker hat, a traditional form of collapsible oilskin rain hat, also known as a sou'wester

== See also ==
- Slacker (disambiguation)
