= ElliptiGO =

Exercise machine manufacturer

ElliptiGO, Inc.
- Company type: Private
- Industry: Bicycles, Elliptical Trainers
- Founded: 2008
- Founders: Bryan Pate, Brent Teal
- Headquarters: Solana Beach, USA
- Key people: Bryan Pate, CEO; Brent Teal, CTO
- Products: Stand Up and Elliptical Bicycles
- Brands: ElliptiGO
- Website: www.elliptigo.com

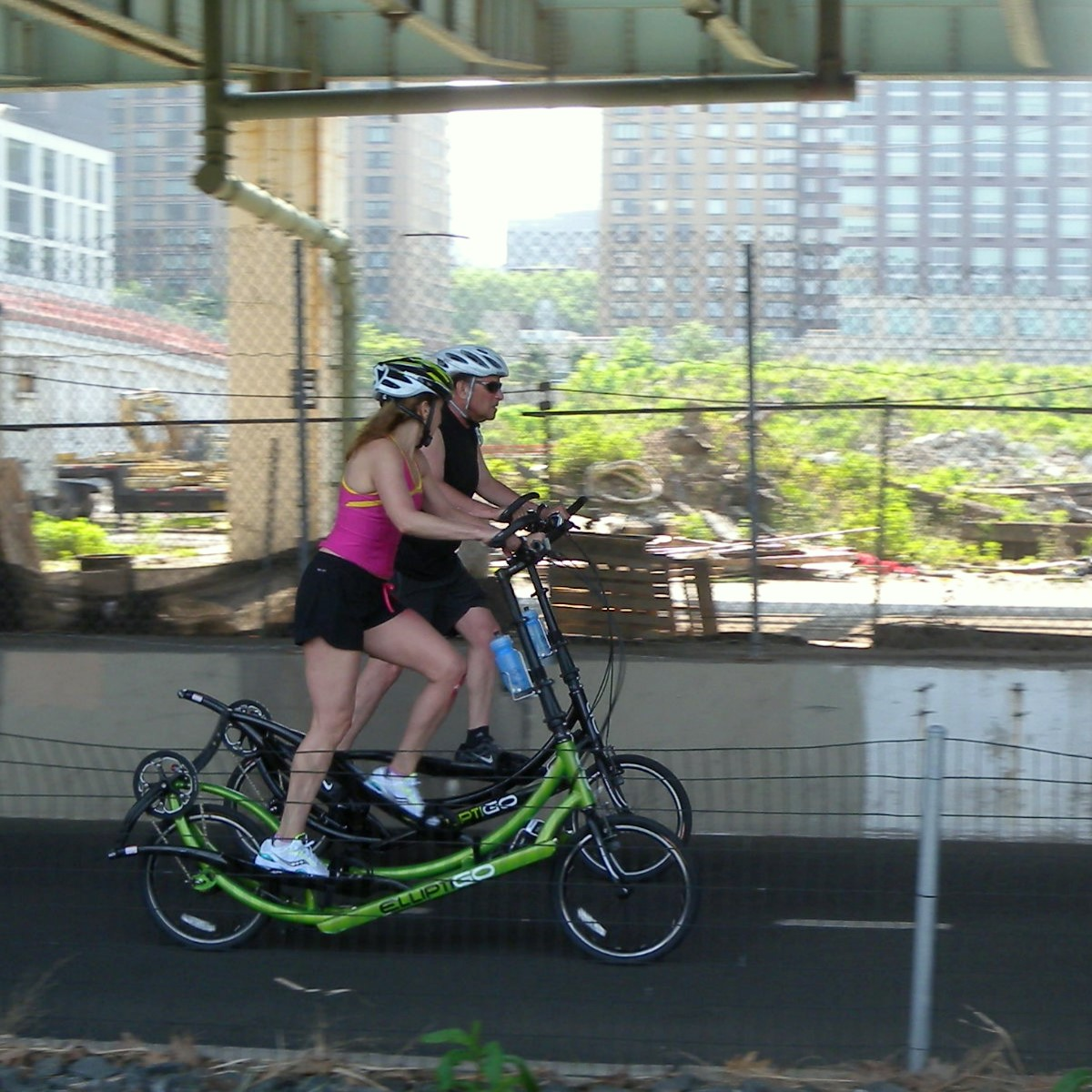
Two ElliptiGOs

ElliptiGO, Inc. is a manufacturer of stand-up and elliptical bicycles headquartered in Solana Beach, California. Elliptical bikes combine the motion of an indoor elliptical trainer with the outdoor mobility of a traditional bicycle. They are a type of treadle bicycle, powered by treadles (which are attached to the crank via a linkage rod), rather than pedals mounted directly on the crank arms. Treadle drive trains were historically intermediate between highwheeled penny-farthings (which were powered by pedals mounted directly on a crank through the wheel hub, like a modern child's tricycle) and the bicycle chain; Elliptigos, like some other later treadle bicycles, use both treadles and a chain.

== History ==
Co-founders Bryan Pate and Brent Teal began working on the idea for ElliptiGO out of their garage in Solana Beach in 2005. A patent for an elliptical bicycle was first registered in 2008. In 2010, ElliptiGO subsequently secured the exclusive rights to the patents. An elliptical bicycle is a device that uses a running-like elliptical motion to propel a bicycle. The first elliptical bike prototype, codenamed "Alfa", was completed by mid-2006.

In 2010, the ElliptiGO 8S, the company's first commercially available elliptical bike, was brought to the market.

Initially, the company raised nearly $800,000 from investors, family, and friends, followed by another $500,000 raised for production.

== Health benefits ==
In 2015, the American Council on Exercise (ACE) commissioned an independent study to determine the effectiveness of a workout on the ElliptiGO bike and how it measures up to accepted fitness industry guidelines for improving cardio respiratory fitness and body composition.

For the study, researchers from the University of Wisconsin, LaCrosse, had 16 healthy female and male volunteers between the ages of 18 and 45 participate in three 15- to 20-minute practice sessions on the ElliptiGO bike before completing a graded maximal exercise test on a treadmill and a 30-minute exercise session on the ElliptiGO bike. During the graded exercise test, expired air and metabolic responses were measured, in addition to recording each participant's ratings of perceived exertion (RPE) at the end of each stage of the test. During the 30-minute exercise session, which was only conducted after the researchers deemed the participant proficient on the ElliptiGO bike, heart rate and oxygen consumption were recorded each minute as the subjects exercised at a self-selected pace; session RPE was also recorded. The study subjects exercised at an average of 84 percent of HRmax and 75 percent of VO2max during the 30-minute exercise session.

ACE's study findings concluded that exercising at a self-selected intensity on the ElliptiGO bike met the guidelines on both accounts.

== ElliptiGO athletes ==
ElliptiGO stand up bikes are used by some professional runners who use the bike to cross train, or add non-impact cardio hours to their training routine, including 2012 US Olympians Meb Keflezighi, and Julie Culley, UK 5000 m specialist Andy Vernon, Dutch elite-marathoner Miranda Boonstra, and 2000 French Olympian Marc Raquil. In addition, some collegiate and professional running teams are using ElliptiGO elliptical bicycles with their athletes, including Stanford University, the University of Guelph in Canada, and The Oregon Track Club Elite.

== Models ==
ElliptiGO sells seven different product models in three product lines. The first model to be available to customers was EliptiGo's model8s. The long-stride line includes the 3C, 8C and 11R, with 3, 8 and 11 gears, respectively. The compact-stride line includes the Arc 3, Arc 8 and Arc 24, with 3, 8 and 24 gears, respectively. The SUB (Stand Up Bike) is ElliptiGO's newest bike. In October 2021, the company recalled its Arc 3, Arc 8 and Arc 24 models in the United States and Canada.

Riders on EliptiGos can reach 25 miles per hour. They are designed to be used outdoors.

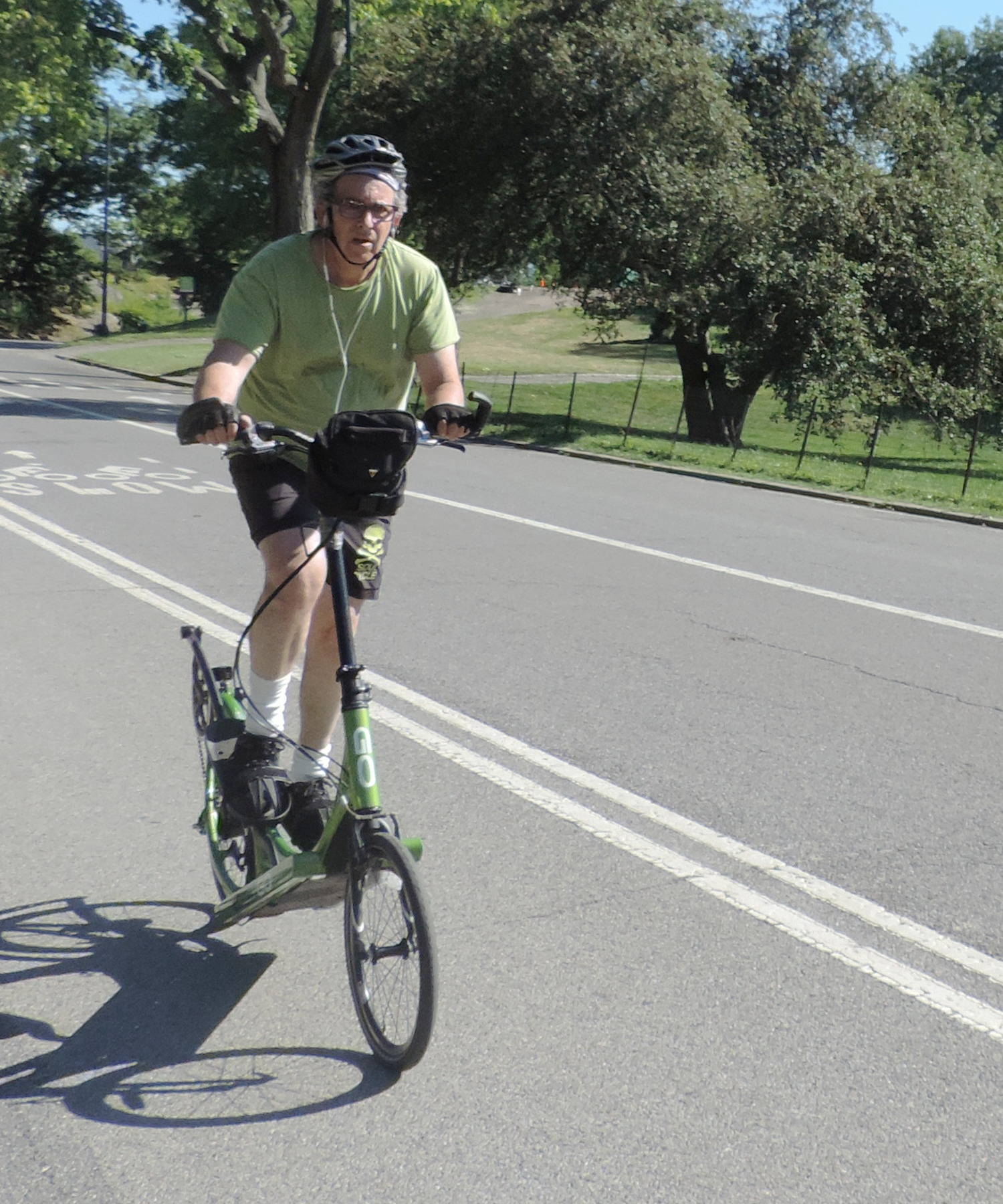
ElliptiGO in use

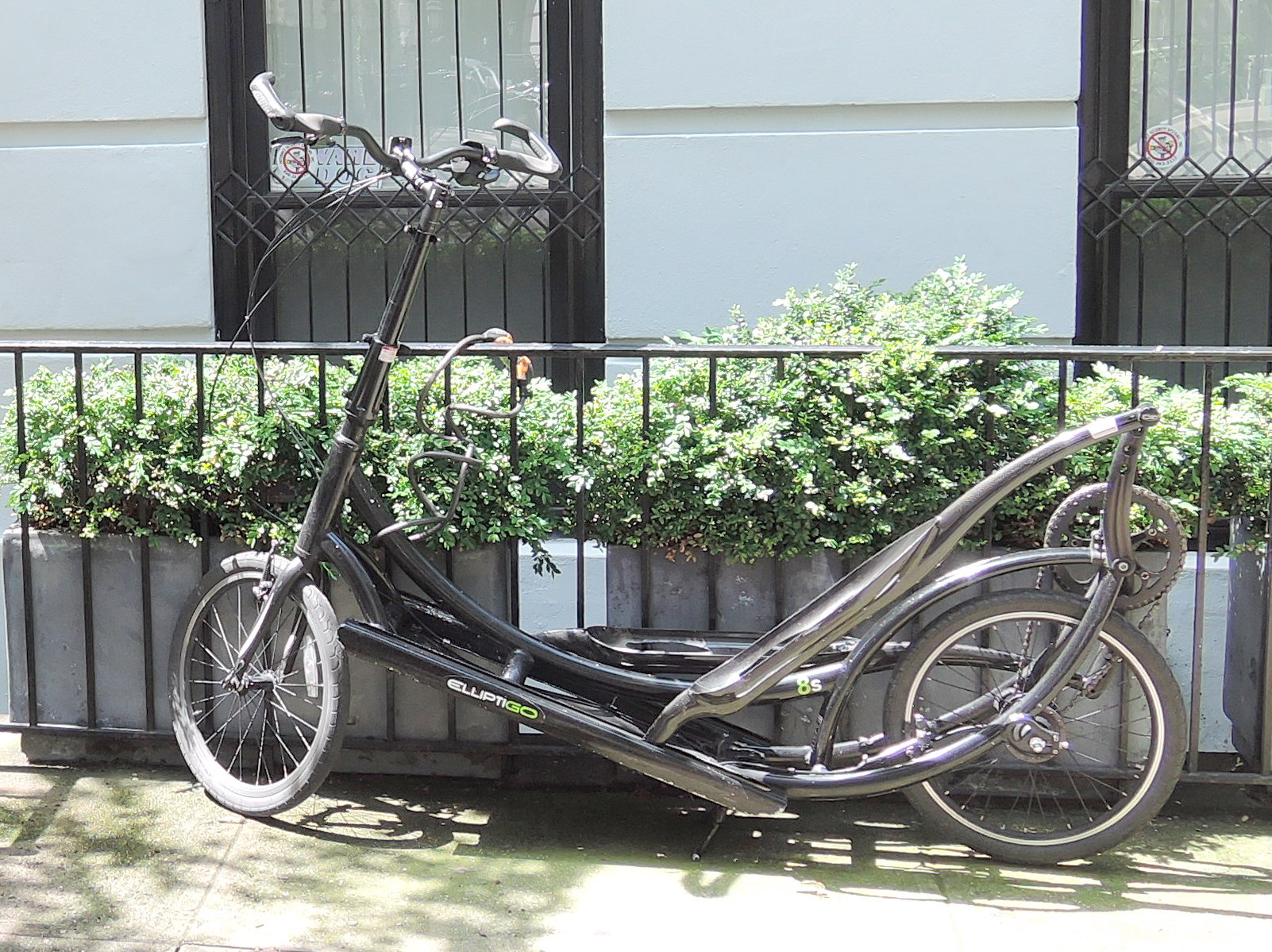
ElliptiGO parked

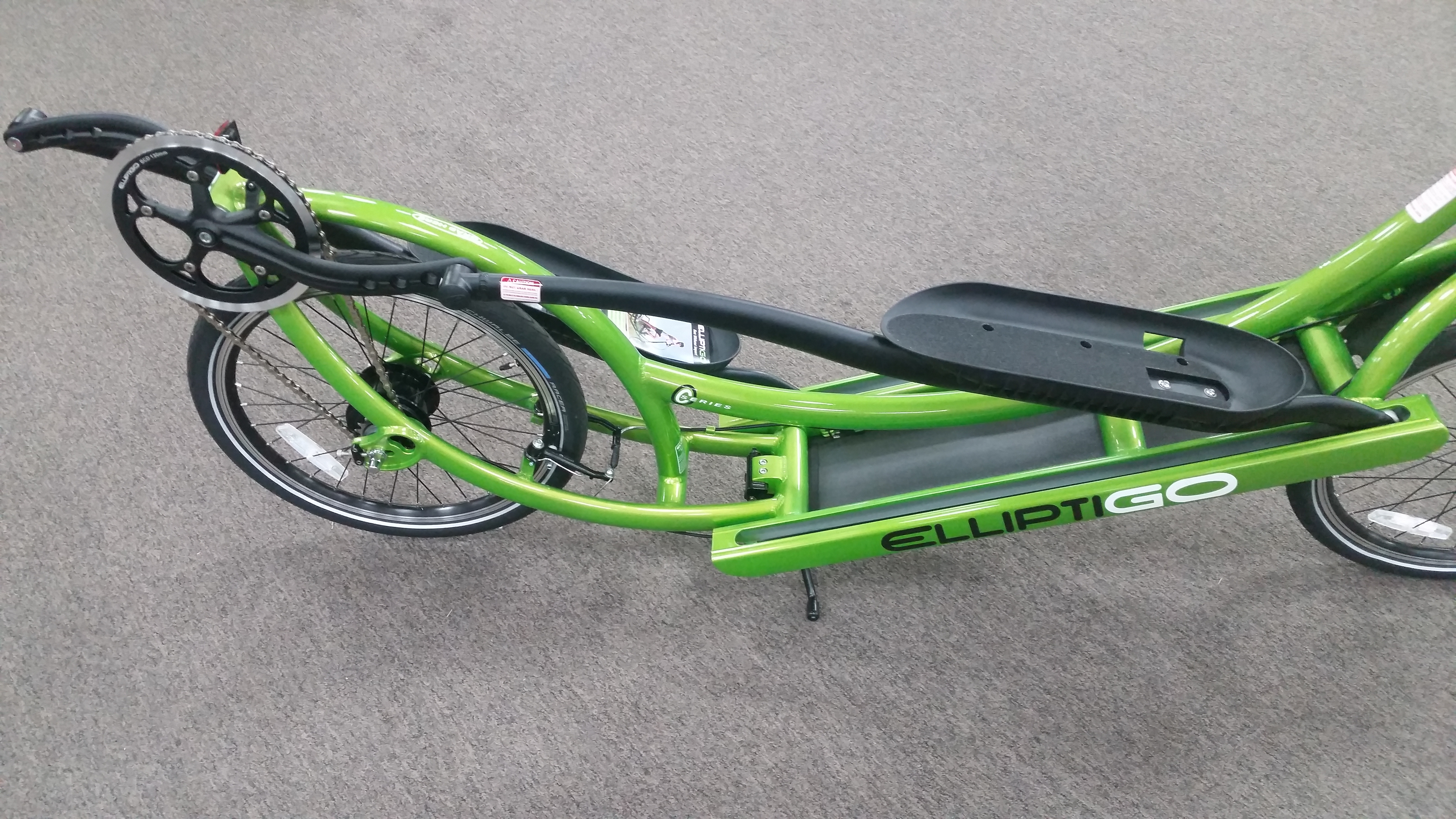
Drivetrain

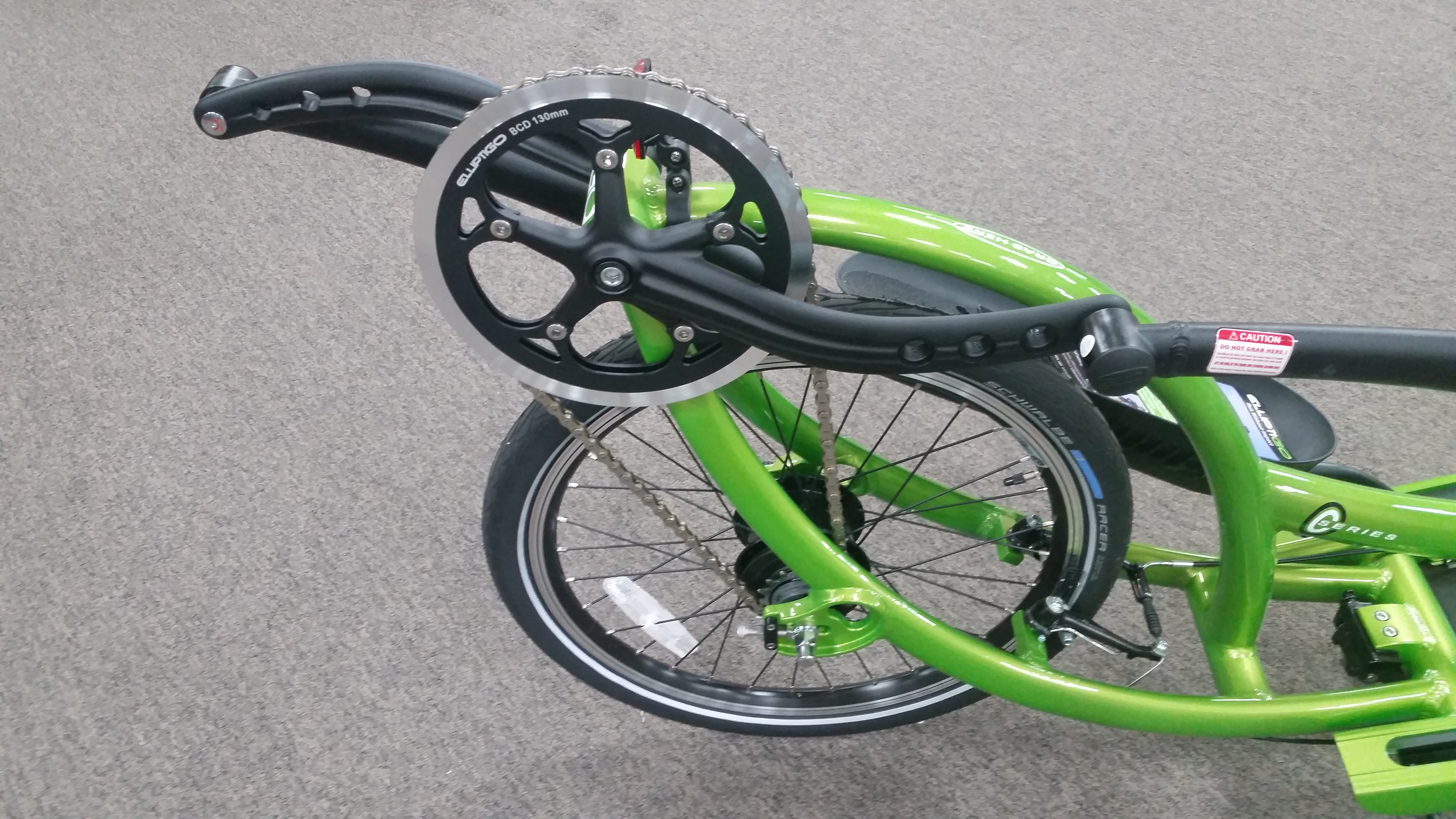
Drivetrain detail
