= Dylan Berry =

American music composer

Dylan R. Berry
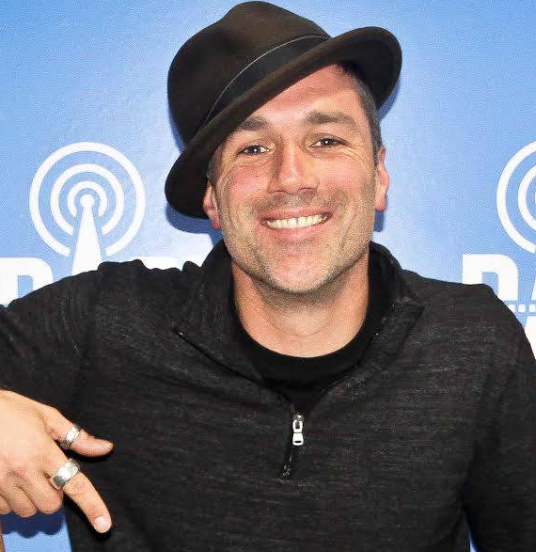
- Dylan Berry
- Born: October 30, 1974 (age 51)
- Occupations: Music composer, radio host, entrepreneur
- Years active: 2001-present
- Notable work: Composer for Academy Awards, Black Sails, So You Think You Can Dance, American Idol; TV Producer, Creative Director for Badanamu; 29 Time Platinum Record Producer; 34 Platinum Singles - Record Producer

Dylan R. Berry (born October 30, 1974) Is an ARIA Award-nominated, Hollywood Music in Media Award and Mark Award-winning Music Producer, Creative Director, serial Entrepreneur and entertainment industry investor. Berry has managed, published and produced media music for television shows including the Academy Awards, American Idol, So You Think You Can Dance, Scream Queens and the MTV Music Awards. He has created branded music for over 20 major networks including Starz, Time Warner Sportsnet, Time Warner News Network, Root Sports Network, ESPN's SportsCenter and all 10 of the Encore Network stations, for which Berry won a Hollywood Music in Media Award. Berry is a 28-time Platinum record producer and has also composed and coordinated music for the Oscars, Spike Awards, Victoria's Secret Fashion Shows, among others.

== Career ==
=== Hollowstone Music ===
From 2001 to 2009, Berry was President and Owner of Hollowstone Music, where he composed music for television channels such as History and National Geographic. Under Hollowstone Music, Dylan wrote over 100 hours of music alongside his business partner, Noah Lifschey. The company was later sold in 2009.

=== Levels Music Group ===
Following Hollowstone Music, Dylan launched Levels Music Group, a partnership with Levels Audio, where he composed music for television and award shows including The Academy Awards, American Idol, So You Think You Can Dance, The Sing-Off, Surviving the Cut, Downfall, the Comedy Central Roast Series, The MTV Music Awards and many others.

=== Smash Haus Music Group ===
Dylan Berry is listed in the top 1% "most prolific" composers in media music on IMDb and has composed music for 30+ TV Networks including Time Warner Sportsnet, Time Warner News, Encore, Starz, ESPN SportsCenter and more.

Berry currently owns and operates Smash Haus Music Group, a company which deploys proprietary technologies throughout the media industry providing original music at scale for media production companies for use in media, television and branded content.

He is credited with providing music for television shows and specials including Academy Awards, American Idol, So You Think You Can Dance Here Comes Honey Boo Boo, America's Got Talent, Amish Mafia, Kevin Hart's Laugh at My Pain, The Sing Off and America's Best Dance Crew, among others.

=== Record Production Work ===
Berry is an ARIA-nominated, Mark Award and Hollywood Music in Media Award-winning record producer and a 28 time Platinum record Producer.

Currently a member of the trip-hop, dub revival group Frivolous Drivel with Greco Rossetti.

Former partner and founder of the production team, The Filthy Fidgets with business partner and co-producer Stefan Litrownik. Together the team is credited with producing for notable acts such as Imagine Dragons, One Direction, Andy Grammer, The Living End, Verdine White of Earth, Wind & Fire, Emblem3 and Billy Ray Cyrus.

=== Bompop Media ===
Bompop Media is a media production company in Hollywood, California that produces high-impact, celebrity and industry-based, behind-the-scenes media for TV, web and radio. Bompop Media syndicates this content globally through a network of strategic partners in the social and content creator space.

Berry is the host and founder of Bompop Media, which broadcasts BompopTV & Bompop Radio a weekly influencer and industry-related talk show that features celebrity talent, supports emerging talent while exploring the roots to realities of working in Hollywood and the Entertainment industry. Bompop Radio is a partnership with collaborator, TV personality and notable influencer DJ Skee, who was voted by Forbes and Rolling Stone Magazine as one of the most influential tastemakers in music and media.

In early 2016, Bompop Radio transitioned to BompopTV, an audiovisual web series which explores the depths and realities of leading creators, personalities and tastemakers in music and entertainment. Later that year, Berry was awarded 3 YouTube Silver Play Buttons.

Dylan hosted 2016 and 2017 Hollywood Music in Media Awards of which he had won two years earlier for his work on Encore Network Theme Packages.

=== SoundCloud ===
In March 2020, BompopTV was acquired by SoundCloud. Following the acquisition, Dylan was made the program director for Dash Radio's 'SoundCloud Radio', a 24/7 music station catering to 240 million music makers worldwide. He is currently the host of the 'Emerging Artist Hour' which airs every Friday at 12PM PST / 3PM EST on SoundCloud Radio.

== Awards ==
=== Hollywood Media in Music Awards ===
Year	Recipients	Nominated work	Result
2014	Dylan Berry, Stefan Litrownik, Craig Cleek (Encore Network)	Original Song/Score - Special Feature	Won
