= Cross-training =

Athletic training

Cross-training is athletic training in sports other than the athlete's usual sport. The goal is improving overall performance. It takes advantage of the particular effectiveness of one training method to negate the shortcomings of another.

== In general sports ==
Cross-training in sports and fitness involves combining exercises to work various parts of the body. Often one particular activity works certain muscle groups, but not others; cross-training aims to eliminate this imbalance.

=== In mixed martial arts ===
In mixed martial arts and self-defense, cross-training refers to training in multiple martial arts or fighting systems to become proficient in all the phases of unarmed combat. This training is meant to overcome the shortcomings of one style by practicing another style which is strong in the appropriate area. A typical combination involves a striking-based art such as Muay Thai, combined with a grappling-based art such as wrestling and Brazilian Jiu-Jitsu. Many hybrid martial arts can be considered derivatives of such cross-training.

Modern mixed martial-arts training generally involves cross-training in the different aspects and ranges of fighting.

=== Water sports ===
In water sports, cross-training often involves doing exercises and training on land. This is often referred to by swimmers as "dryland". For swimming, cross-training frequently includes running, stretching, and other resistance and agility training. Diving dryland exercises include various unique exercises such as on-land landing biomechanics training.

=== Hybrid athlete ===
A hybrid athlete is an individual who possesses a balance of both strength and endurance. They possess a diverse set of skills and abilities, distinct from specialized athletes such as bodybuilders or marathon runners. Instead, these athletes prioritize overall fitness, seeking to achieve a well-rounded level of physical capability.

== See also ==
- Cross-trainer
- CrossFit
- Chess boxing
- Interdisciplinarity
- List of multi-sport athletes
- Multisport race
- Pentathlon
- Pilates
