= Power training =

Common type of speed and strength training

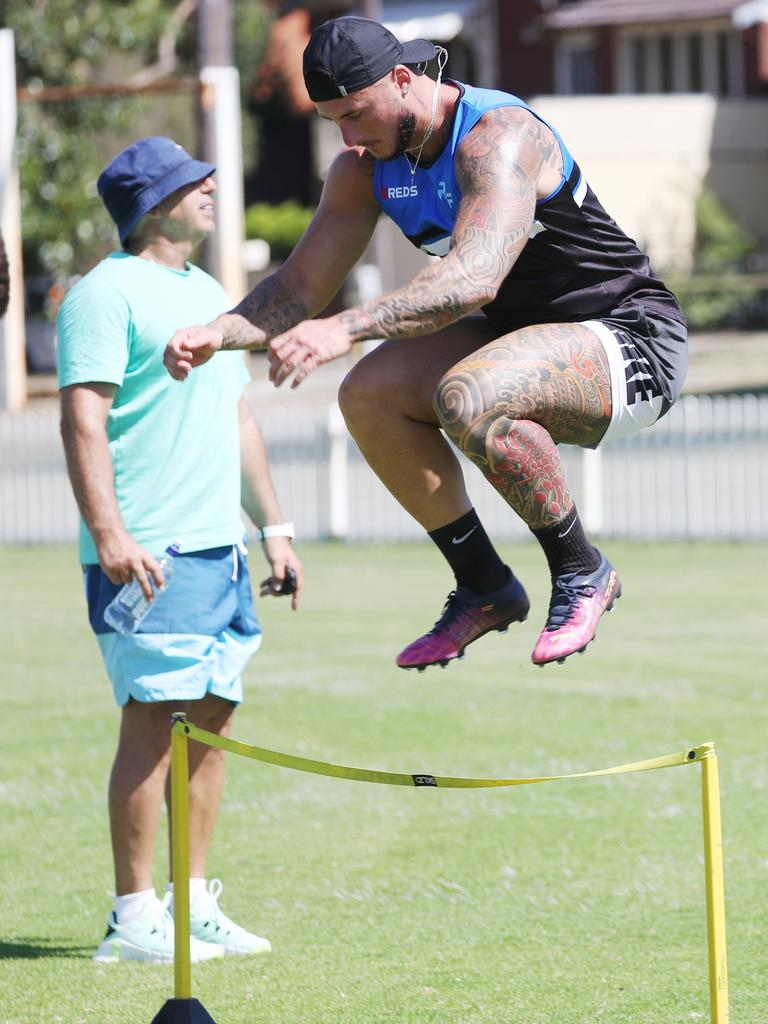
A tuck jump is a simple and effective plyometric power training method. It can be performed for height, distance or both and may or may not involve equipment.

Power training involves exercises which apply the maximum amount of force as fast as possible on the basis that strength + speed = power. Jumping with weights or throwing weights are two examples of power training exercises. Regular weight training exercises such as the clean and jerk and power clean may also be considered as being power training exercises due to the explosive speed required to complete the lifts. Power training may also involve contrasting exercises such as heavy lifts and plyometrics, known as complex training, in an attempt to combine the maximal lifting exertions with dynamic movements. This combination of a high strength exercise with a high speed exercise may lead to an increased ability to apply power. Power training frequently specifically utilises two physiological processes which increase in conjunction with one another during exercise. These are deep breathing, which results in increased intra-abdominal pressure; and post-activation potentation, which is the enhanced activation of the nervous system and increased muscle fibre recruitment. Power training programmes may be shaped to increase the trainee's ability to apply power in general, to meet sports specific criteria, or both.

== Specific forms of power training ==
There are various forms of power training which may be used singularly or in combination with one another.

=== Plyometrics ===
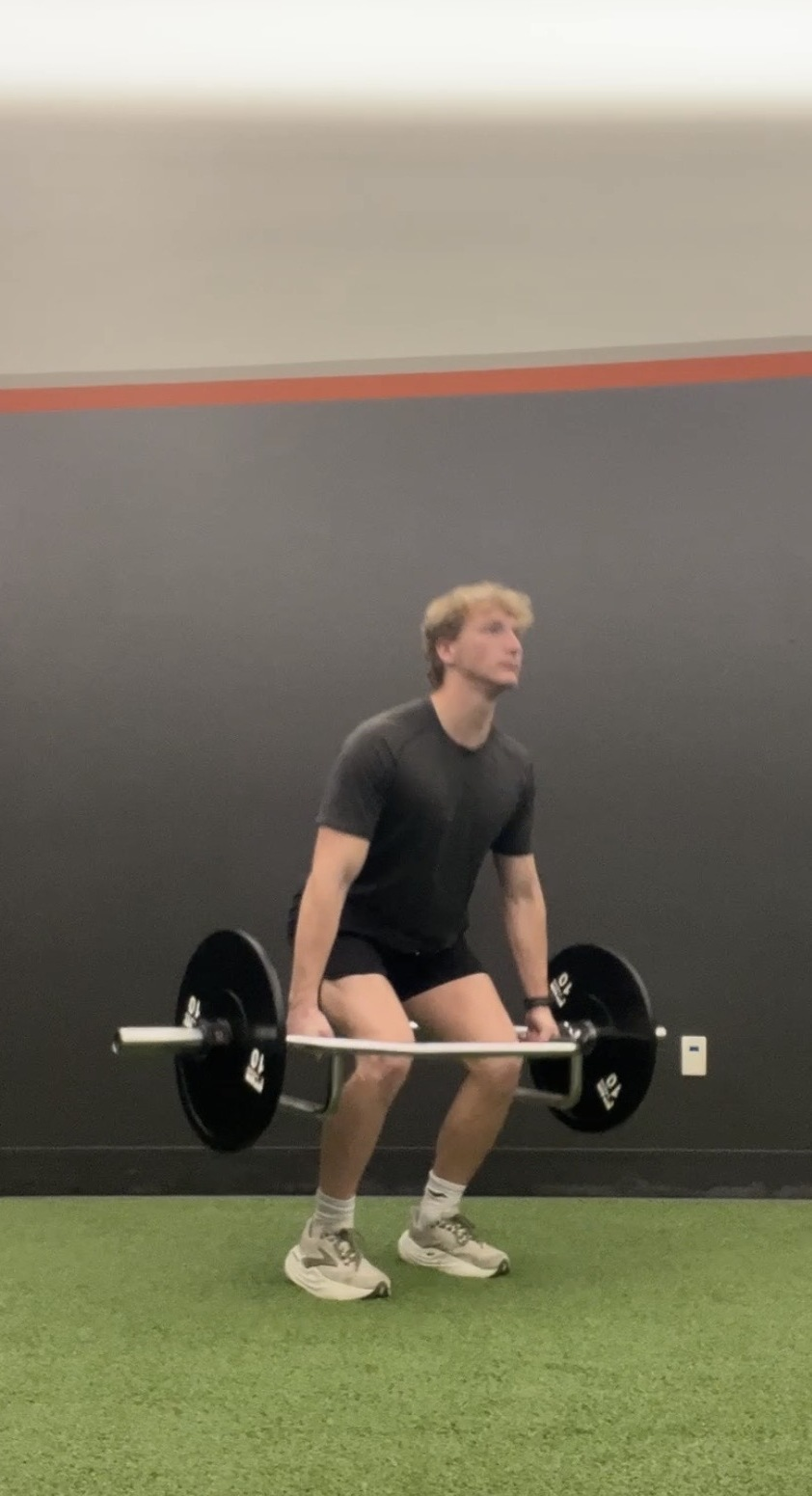
A trap bar jump is a loaded plyometric exercise designed to enhance explosive power. The athlete is currently in the preloading crouch phase and about to jump.

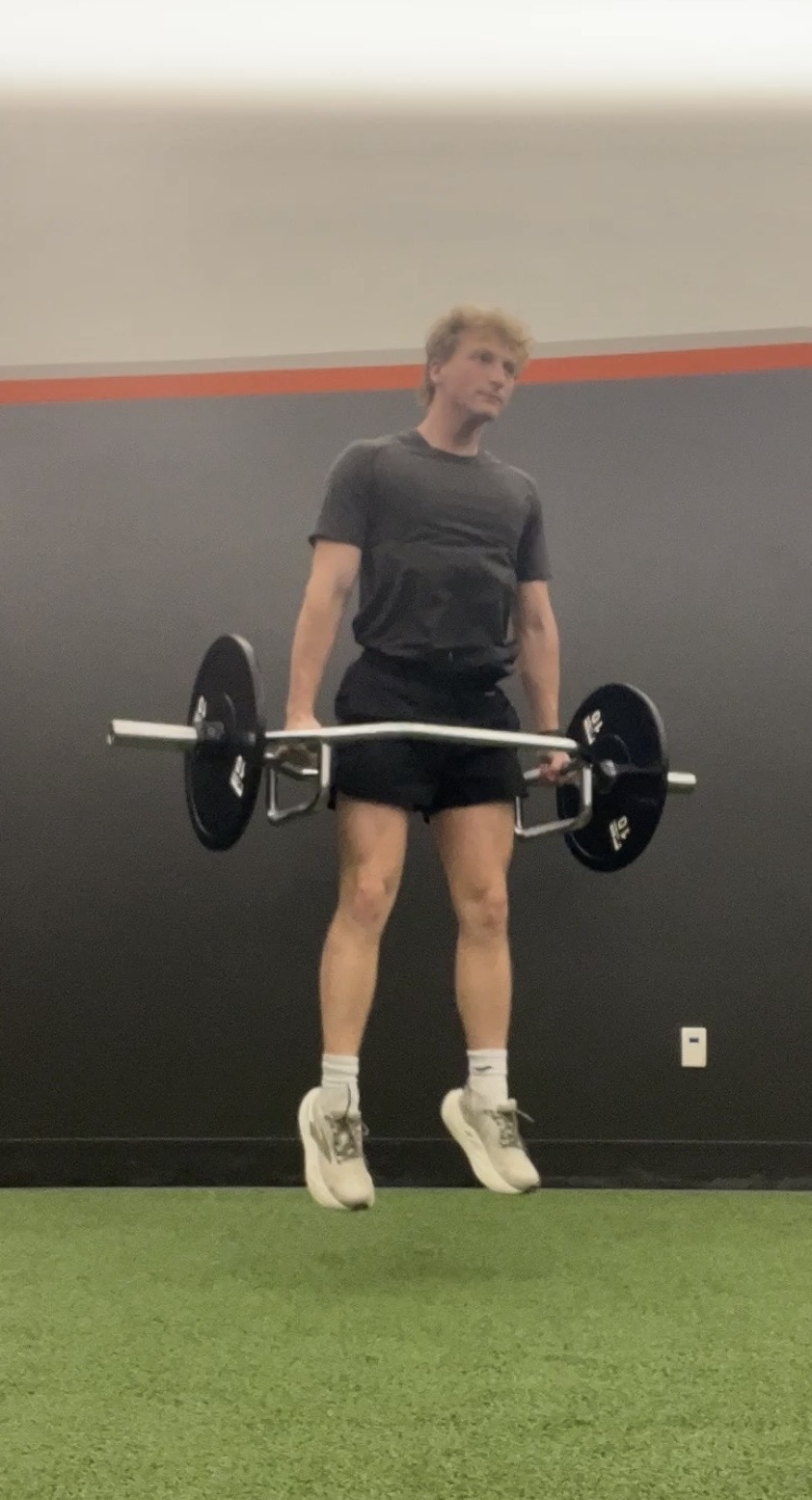
The jumping phase of the exercise.

Plyometric training typically involves jumping exercises. These exercises may begin from the feet only or also involve taking off from the hands such as is found in a plyometric push up. Plyometric may also refer to exercises which involve similar quick movements of the body performed in a repetitive manner, such as repeatedly throwing a medicine ball in the air, catching it, and throwing it up again and so forth. Usually, an exercise is considered plyometric or not based upon its speed, the rapidity of its repetitions, and the extent to which it utilises the body's stretch-shortening cycle. This cycle is where a muscle alternately lengthens (an eccentric action) and then shortens (a concentric action) in quick succession, typically as part of one repetition of an exercise. The performance of repetitive jumps and sprinting both clearly emphasise the stretch shortening cycle. By utilising and enhancing the power generating nature of this cycle, plyometric training specifically seeks to enable an athlete to perform all parts of an exercise faster. For example, plyometric jumps are performed in rapid succession by increasing the speed of both the jumping and landing phase i.e. exploding upwards into the jump faster and crouching faster to absorb the impact when landing, means multiple repetitions can be performed more rapidly. Training in this manner has direct carry over to achievement in many athletic and sporting disciplines as they tend to require similar quick actions e.g. many sportspeople sprint during a game. As with all forms of power training, it is recommended to athletes that they first make sure that they are technically proficient in the exercise and can maintain good form, and that they are in good physical condition in general, before making the exercises increasingly explosive in nature.

==== Loaded plyometrics ====
Loaded plyometrics, also known as weighted jumps, refers to the addition of a load, or weight, to jumping exercises. Jumping up and down with a trap bar for instance, or with a barbell held over the head. Loaded plyometrics may increase explosive power more so than unloaded plyometrics. Two people can also co-operate in order to perform loaded plyometric exercises. For example, one person can carry the other on their back while they jump, or hop from foot to foot.

==== Unilateral plyometrics ====
Unilateral plyometrics is whereby only one leg is used at a time, such as in hopping (also known as a single leg jump) or in single leg bounding (jumping for distance). The exercises may be performed repetitively with the same leg or by alternating between the left and right legs. In the case of alternating between the legs, this should be considered as different to running because it is still a jumping action and not a stepping action. However, the range of movement is similar to a running step and involves a similar phase of acceleration during. For these reasons, unilateral plyometric exercises have a high-degree of transferability to running, and can be used especially to enhance sprint ability.

=== Ballistic training ===
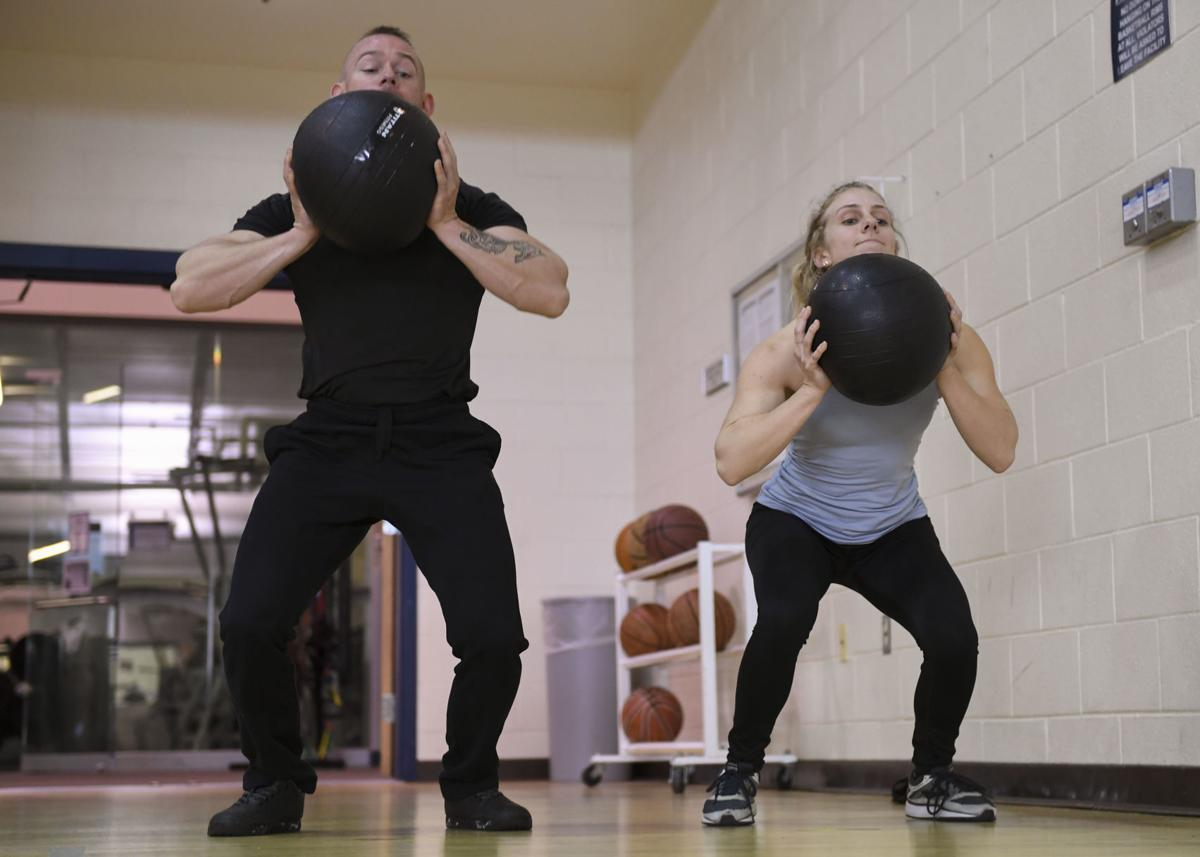
Ballistic training consisting of throwing medicine balls. Note the preparatory crouched posture which preloads the legs and core; this helps to increase the power of the throw.

Ballistic training is based upon maximising the acceleration phase of an object and minimising the deceleration phase. This may involve throwing a weight, as the term ballistic implies, but may also involve jumping whilst holding a weight or swinging a weight. Examples include throwing a medicine ball, jumping with a trap bar, or swinging a weighted club.

=== Complex training ===
Complex training, sometimes referred to as contrast training, involves alternating heavy lifts with plyometric exercises. Ideally, the exercises should move through similar ranges of motion. For example, a set of back squats at about 85-95% 1RM followed by a set of vertical jumps. The intention is to utilise the PAP effect from the heavy back squats in the jumping exercises and thereby increase the power with which the jumps are performed with. Over a period of training, this may increase the trainee's ability to perform the plyometric exercise more powerfully without the preceding heavy lift being required.

=== Contrast loading ===
Contrast loading involves the alternation of heavy and light loads in weight training exercises. The light lifts should be considerably lighter than the heavy lifts. For example, a bench press exercise at about 85-95% 1RM followed by a set at about 30-60% 1RM. The heavy lifts should be performed fast with the lighter lifts being performed as fast as possible. The joints should not be locked as this inhibits muscle fibre recruitment and reduces the speed at which the exercise can be performed. Weighted jumps or a throwing exercise may take the place of the lighter lifts.

=== Explosive power lifts ===
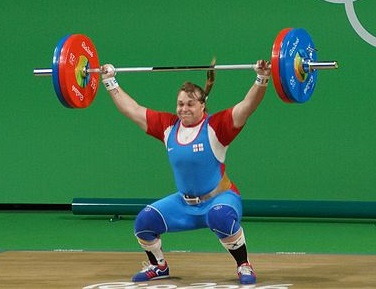
This elite level performance of the snatch demonstrates the explosive power that is required to move the bar overhead. This would be unachievable at a slower speed.

Explosive power lifts are weight training exercises which require a very fast movement to be performed by the lifter in order to lift the weight. For instance, in a power clean, a barbell is quickly lifted from the floor and unto the upper chest; this must be performed fast in one dynamic movement otherwise it would not be possible to move the weight to this position. Similarly, in a snatch, a lifter moves a barbell to a position above their head whilst they quickly lower their height to allow for the easier extension of their arms; this movement must be performed in one very quick fluid action. If the lifter attempted to press the weight above their head slowly then they would not be able to. It is the dramatic increase in speed which allows for the lift to be completed and it is therefore an essential component.

=== Velocity based training ===
Velocity based training or VBT involves the use of specialist equipment which provides objective feedback about velocity achieved and power output e.g. an accelerometer on a barbell, or a multi-camera recording set up. The use of real-time objective feedback has been shown to increase intent and motivation in lifters, leading to enhanced power output within training sessions and increased adaptations over time.

=== Gymnastics ===
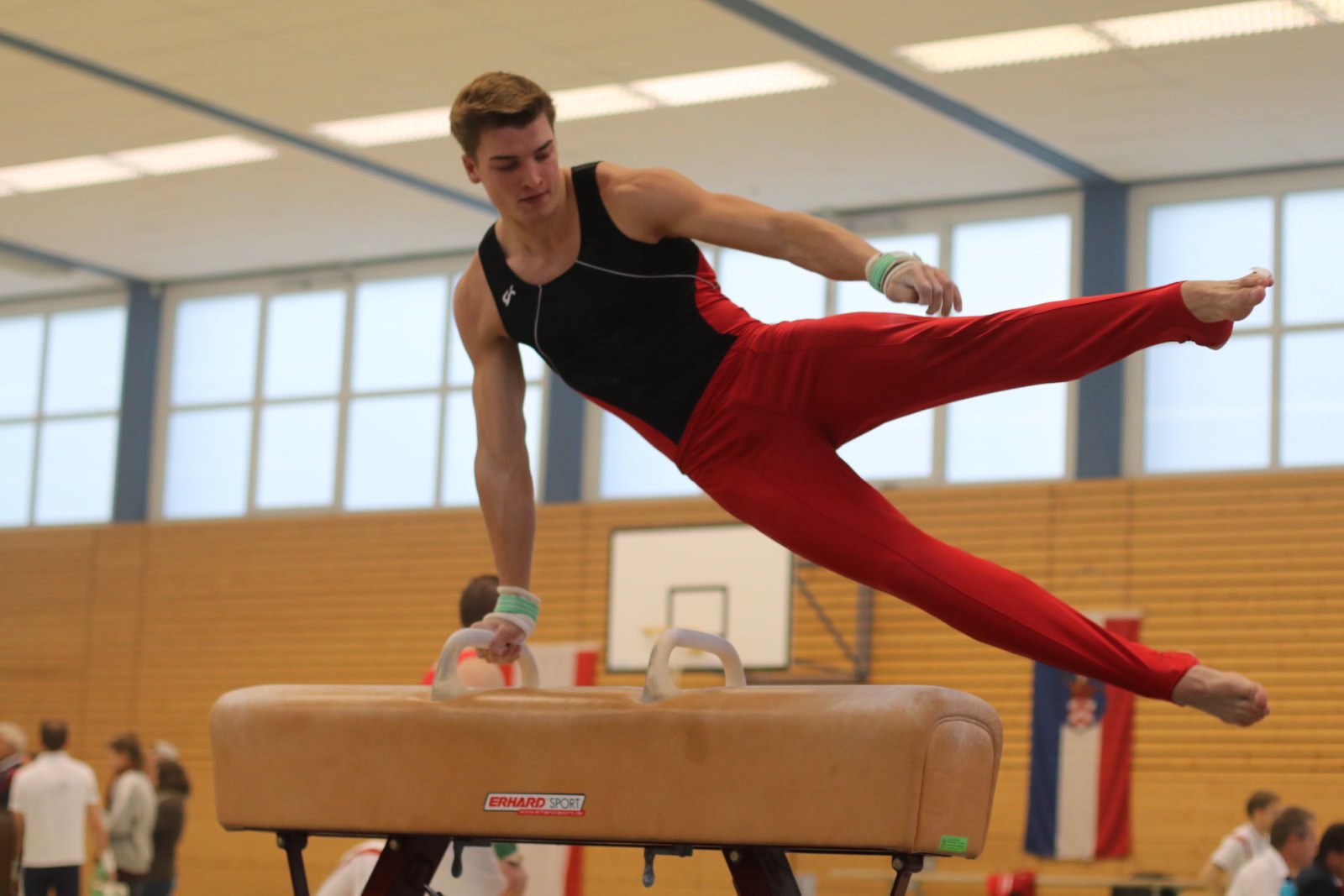
A gymnast using a pommel horse. Traditionally this specific exercise is only performed by male gymnasts.

Gymnastic exercises may be considered as being calisthenic in nature with a particular focus on achieving high levels of speed, rhythm and co-ordination. In addition to developing overall power and endurance, they are excellent for developing the strength and mobility of the core and joints. In a study of the power output of gymnasts, Monem Jemni attests that the high peak-power outputs gymnasts are capable of place them near the top level for power athletes; notably, higher than elite level wrestlers. Gymnastic exercises include the pommel horse, rings, parallel bars, vaulting with the use of apparatus, and various forms of dance and somersaults.

=== Unilateral training ===
Unilateral training is the use of one limb from a pair in an exercise i.e. one leg as opposed to two legs (which is bilateral). In regard to the lower body, it 'can refine specific movement skills and improve overall power delivery through individual legs.' It can also help to enhance a person's ability to balance, as the demands are greater when only one leg is used in an exercise. For similar reasons, core strength can also be improved because the stabilising demands on the core are increased due to the working limb being to one side of the body's centre of mass. Unilateral training can also be used to address an excessive strength discrepancy between a pair of limbs. In any unilateral exercise, where the limbs are used alternatively and the ROM and resistance is constant, both limbs will perform the same amount of work. However, in bilateral exercises where two limbs are used, one limb of the pair may be doing an excessively large amount of work and the strength discrepancy this leads to may mean that the person's ability to produce power is adversely affected and they may be more prone to injury. As such, unilateral training may be used to correct or avoid excessive strength imbalances between the limbs and reduce the risk of injury. Due to the high transferability of the benefits of unilateral training to running, which itself is a unilateral exercise, it features frequently in sports training. The most common recommendation is that it is used in combination with bilateral training.

=== Sprint training ===
Sprint training is usually meant in regard to running but may also include cycling or swimming. It is an effective means of training the body to be able to perform faster for longer. As well as increasing technical proficiency in that form of sprint, it also develops overall power, cardiovascular capacity, and muscular endurance. The benefits of sprint training in terms of developing a greater power output can therefore help in the performance of other explosive power movements. It will usually be included in any comprehensive power training regime.

Examples of sprinting

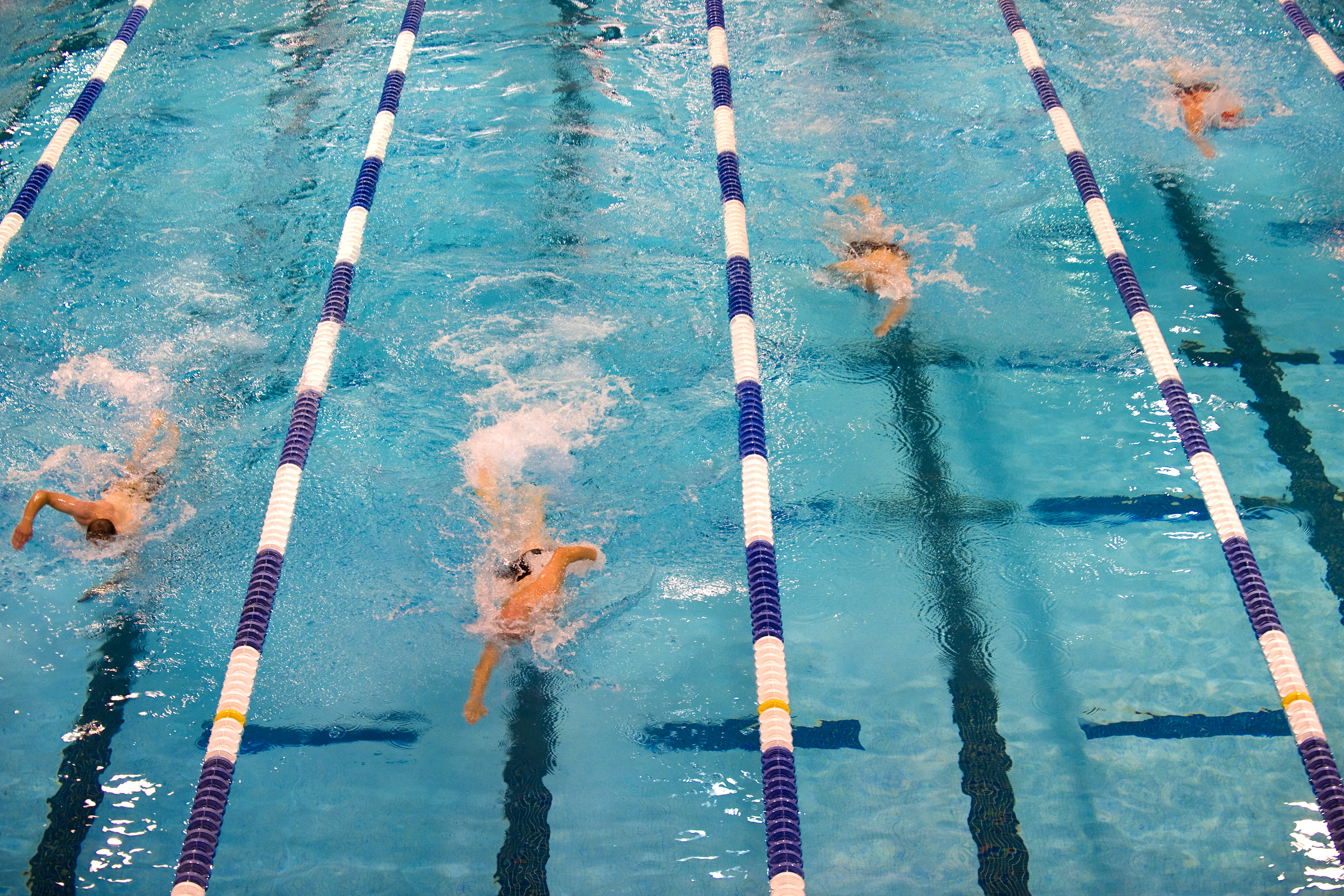
Swimming

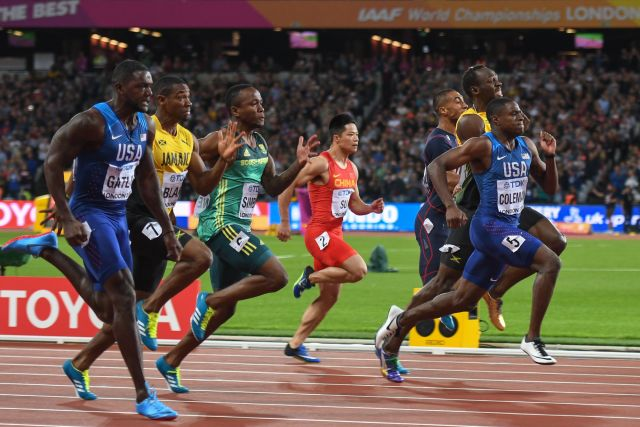
Running

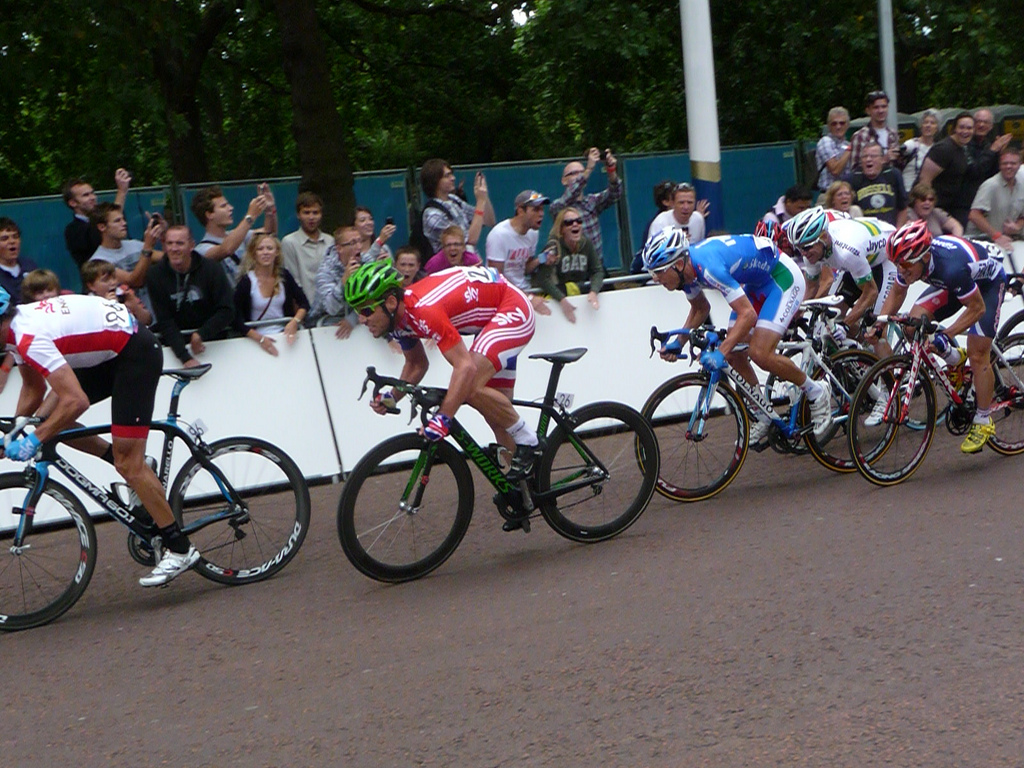
Cycling

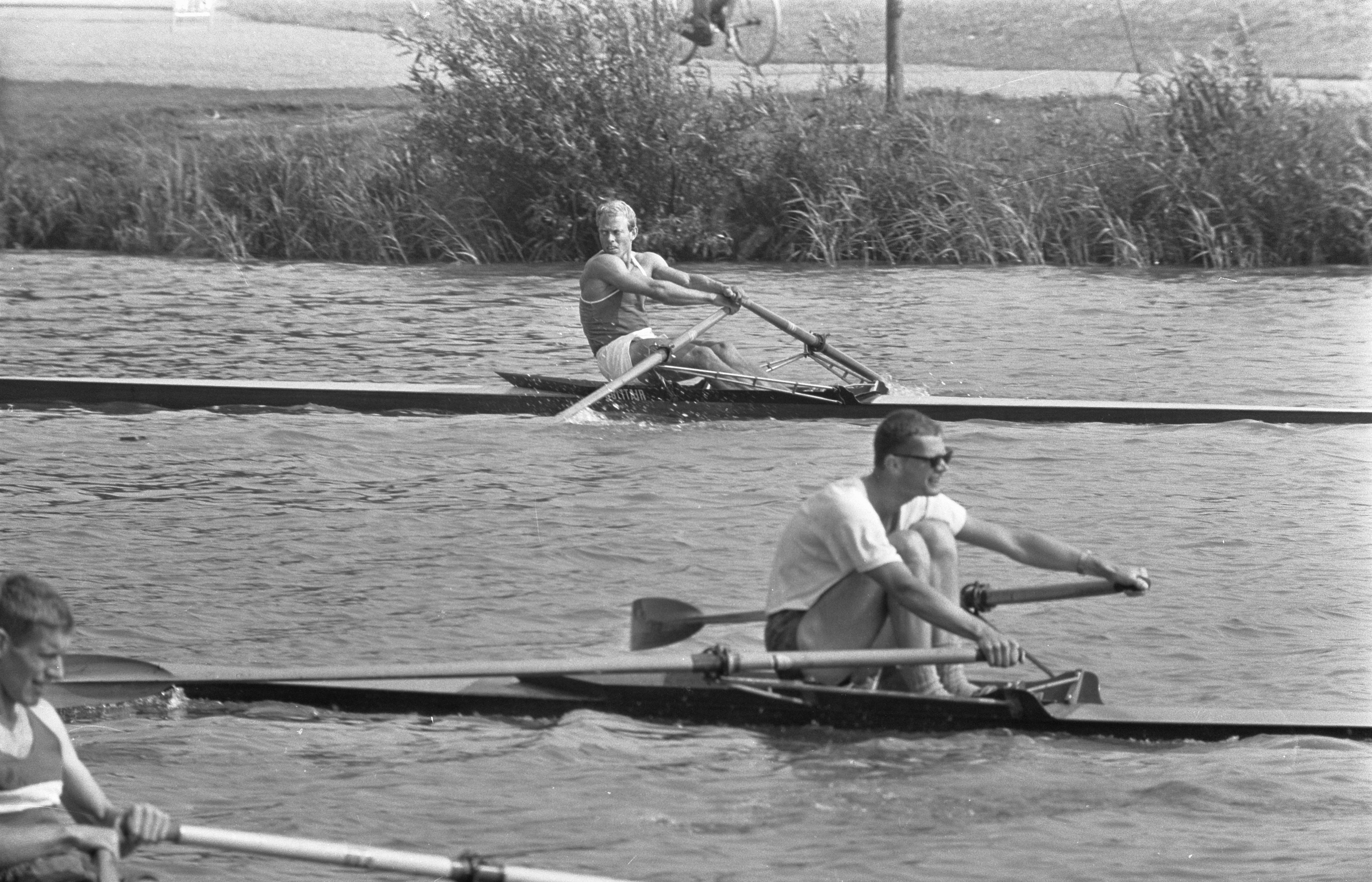
Rowing

== Related physiological processes ==
=== Deep breathing and intra-abdominal pressure ===
During exercise a person breathes deeper in order to meet higher oxygen requirements. This adoption of a deeper breathing pattern also serves a secondary function of strengthening the core of the body. This strengthening effect occurs because the thoracic diaphragm adopts a lower position than it does than when at rest; this generates increased intra-abdominal pressure which helps to strengthen the lumbar spine and the core of the body overall. For this reason, taking a deep breath, or adopting a deeper breathing pattern, is a fundamental requirement when lifting heavy weights.

=== Post-activation potentiation (PAP) ===
The term post-activation potentiation is used to describe the increased performance or power output after performing a strength exercise.

During exercise the nervous system becomes increasingly active and an increased number of muscle fibres are recruited in order to aid the performance of the exercise. This effect is especially apparent during the lifting of heavy weights. Subsequently, to the performance of the exercise, the increased nervous system activation and recruitment of muscle fibres continues for a period of time; this is referred to as post-activation potentiation, or the PAP effect, and may lead to an increased ability to apply power. For example, if a light weight is lifted, and then a heavy weight is lifted, and then the same light weight is lifted again, then the light weight will feel lighter the second time it is lifted; this is due to the PAP effect from the heavy lift. In complex training the PAP effect may be used to perform plyometric exercises more powerfully, or in contrast loading to perform resistance based exercises more powerfully. Ultimately, the usage of it in a training regime is to condition the trainee to perform with a heightened nervous system activation and increased muscle fibre recruitment; thereby resulting in the ability to move more powerfully as a standard.

== Universal elements of power training ==
=== Core strength ===
The body's core, sometimes referred to as the torso or trunk, supports all other movements of the body. In power movements this is especially the case as the core musculature is increasingly recruited in order to provide additional power. A stronger core also improves a person's ability to balance. The most effective core strength training involves all parts of the core being strengthened. This may involve bending and straightening in all directions (flexing and extending), circular movements (rotation and circumduction), and holding isometric poses. Additional resistance may be added to an exercise as required. The more comprehensive and balanced the training, the greater the benefits to a person's ability to apply power. Notably, this is partly due to avoiding the problem of disproportionately weak core muscles hindering the power output of strong core muscles that they are working in conjunction with.

For example, if a person has trained to bend and straighten their core in a powerful manner, but not trained to rotate their core in a powerful manner, then a compound movement which involves bending, straightening and rotating the core will be limited to what the disproportionately weak rotational strength allows for. The potential advantages of the trained movement range, in terms of bending and straightening, are therefore significantly reduced for that compound movement. Similarly, if a person lacks the muscular strength to stabilise their core in the required manner, then their ability to move powerfully will also be negatively affected. For these reasons, training programmes which focus on the core recommend working to achieve the correct ratio of strength between the muscles via a comprehensive regime. In order to achieve this, and meant as a general guideline, the National Strength and Conditioning Association recommends, for the four main movements of the core, a minimum exercise ratio of 1-1-1-1 e.g. one set each of flexion, extension, lateral flexion, and rotation focused exercises.

The core also acts as a bridge between the upper and lower body, allowing the transference of force from the legs to the arms and vice versa. A stronger core improves this ability to transfer force and a weaker core diminishes it.

=== Joint strength ===
A large amount of power can only be applied if the joints are strong enough to be able to cope with it and transfer it. If a joint is too weak then the power that can be applied by and through that joint is necessarily limited. This is especially the case in dynamic movements which require the rapid application of force to an external object and the absorption of impact forces by the body. For instance, a sprinter must have strong ankle joints in order for their foot to be able to apply leverage and transfer force to the ground, and also to help to absorb any impact forces when the foot is placed. Due to the requirements of any given stride, the ankle must be strengthened in all ranges of movement, including twisting. This can be achieved by running backwards and sideways as well as forwards, or by hopping up and landing facing a different direction for example. A boxer would also need strong ankles but they would also have the added requirement of strong wrists in order to be able to transfer the power of their body adequately to their fists and hence to the target. An example of a wrist strengthening exercise is a one-handed barbell deadlift exercise, which requires increased utilisation of the wrist in order to stabilise the bar. Strong and flexible joints also help to prevent injury. If a joint is injured or excessively weak then it will inhibit the amount of power that it can cope with and transfer, and thereby inhibit movement i.e. a person with a sprained ankle cannot walk properly.

=== Proportions of strength ===
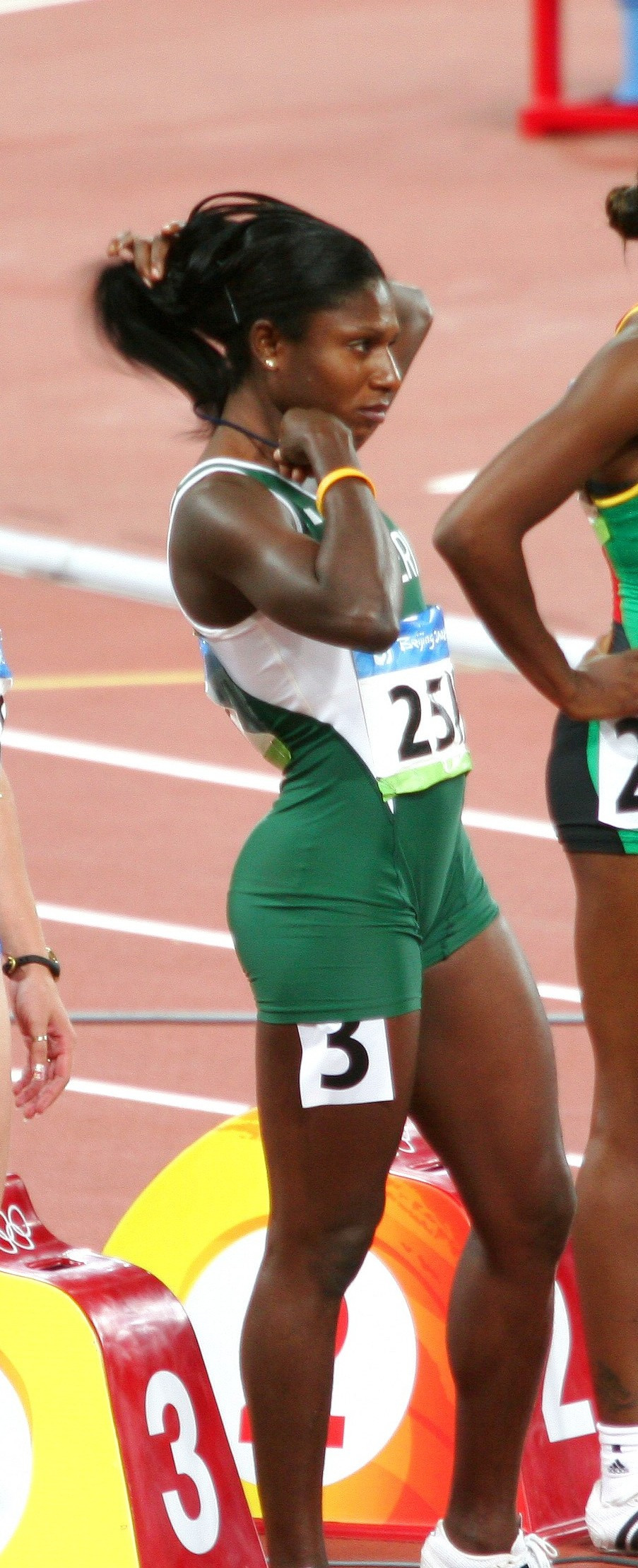
Trained for speed. This sprinter's powerfully developed glutes, thighs, hamstrings and core help her to generate power effectively both in her initial isometric press at the starting blocks and throughout the race.

The body most efficiently produces power when its strength producing areas exist in particular proportions. If these proportions exist in the correct ratio to each other, then power generation can be optimised. Conversely, if one area is too strong, this may mean that it is disproportionately strong relative to other areas of the body. This may cause a number of problems: a weaker area of the body may be excessively strained by working in conjunction with the stronger area; and the stronger area may be slowed by working with the weaker area. Such problems hinder power development.

The optimum proportions of strength for power generation may be non-sports specific and based upon an ability to perform more powerfully in general, or sports specific and based upon the requirements of a particular sport. For example, a sprint cyclist may incorporate heavy back squats into their training regime in order to increase their leg strength, which can in turn help them to generate more power on the bike. However, this may lead to excessive leg strength being developed relative to their core strength. This may hinder any improvement to performance and increase the risk of injury. As such, they may incorporate forms of core training which helps them to perform their back squat more efficiently and reduce the risk of injury. The improved performance of the back squat would also mean it was more beneficial to the cycling action. In such examples the performance of the specific sport or exercise can be improved by ensuring that the involved areas of the body are trained to be in particular proportions of strength, as considered relatively to each other. It is notable that the performance of the sport or exercise alone does not necessarily lead to the body developing in its optimum proportions of strength in order to perform them more powerfully. As stated previously, this result is achieved with the aid of supplementary exercises which optimally influence the body's proportions of strength so a more powerful performance can be achieved.

=== Agility ===
Agility is the ability a person has to move in a controlled manner. It is especially meant in regard to their ability to move precisely, maintain or change their direction of travel, and orientate or reorientate themselves. It is closely related to their overall level of flexibility and their ability to balance including both the maintenance of static postures and moving dynamically in a balanced fashion.

Like the factors of speed and strength, agility is of fundamental importance to a person's ability to move in a powerful manner. If someone is unagile and unable to properly control their movement then they will find it much more difficult to move powerfully. A person can be agile in a specific range of movement or in general. For example, throwing medicine balls will improve their ability to move in that way and therefore they will become more agile at performing that exercise. This additionally allows them to perform it more powerfully. There will, however, be much less of an improvement to their jumping ability.

A higher general level of agility will mean that any given movement can be performed more powerfully as a result. Some exercises improve general levels of agility more than others. For example, jumping and leaping are more effective in this regard than Olympic weight lifting exercises.

Agility training regimes also frequently include a focus on suddenly stopping a movement, absorbing impact, changing direction, explosively accelerating, and a combination thereof. For example, landing from a lateral jump and then quickly performing a vertical jump. Agility drills which feature short sprints and quick changes of direction are a staple feature of many sport training regimes which have a focus on explosive power e.g. American football, basketball, athletics etc. The incorporation of agility exercises into a training regime has been shown to reduce the risk of injury.

== Isometric presses and explosive power movements ==
Immediately prior to performing a powerful movement the body instinctively performs an isometric preload: this generates force in the muscles which adds to the power of the subsequent dynamic movement. A fundamental element of this preloading is an isometric press action. An everyday example is when a person gets up off a chair. The person raises their posterior off the chair and forms an isometric press, involving the downward force of their torso onto their bent legs, which push upwards with an equal amount of force. From this point the person then stands up. The isometric press which was generated by the torso and the legs helped them to preload their muscles so as to aid the subsequent move to stand up fully. A more dynamic example of this process can be found in a vertical jump. In this case, the jumper crouches down, generates an isometric press involving the downward force of their torso and the upward force of their bent legs, before powering upwards into the jump. Isometric presses may also be adapted to suit sports specific requirements, such as in boxing. Here, a boxer may position their bodyweight primarily over their bent lead leg before throwing a lead hook. The force generated by the isometric press, involving the downward force of the torso and the upward force of the lead leg, is channelled into the subsequent punch making it more powerful. In athletic events such as sprinting, deliberate apparatus, called starting blocks, are used so the sprinters can perform a more powerful isometric press and channel this additional power into their first strides forwards: this ability to perform an enhanced isometric press allows them to start faster. Isometric presses may be performed faster or slower and in a variety of different ways but all perform the same role of isometrically preloading the muscles so a subsequent dynamic movement can be performed more powerfully. For this reason, isometric presses feature strongly in sports and athletics. The force they can generate can be increased and their instinctive use can be encouraged through the training of the respective actions required to form them (e.g. knee raises, sit-ups, squats, jumps) and the associated musculature (e.g. glutes, thighs, hamstrings, core). In terms of a person's direct utilisation of isometric presses as a power generation method, this is achieved as part of their instinctive and intuitive performance of isometric preloads, and their further deliberate intensification of them.

Examples of isometric presses in sport and athletics

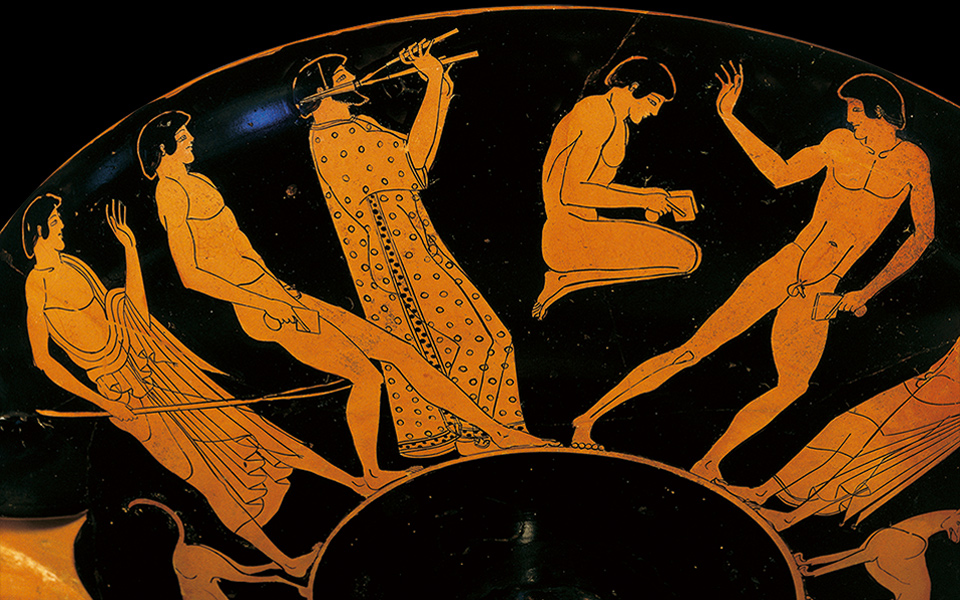
The jumper on the left performs a distinctive isometric press, primarily by applying downward pressure onto his bent rear leg. This acts as a means of preloading the muscles prior to engaging in a jump from standing. The jumper to the right of him is mid-flight.

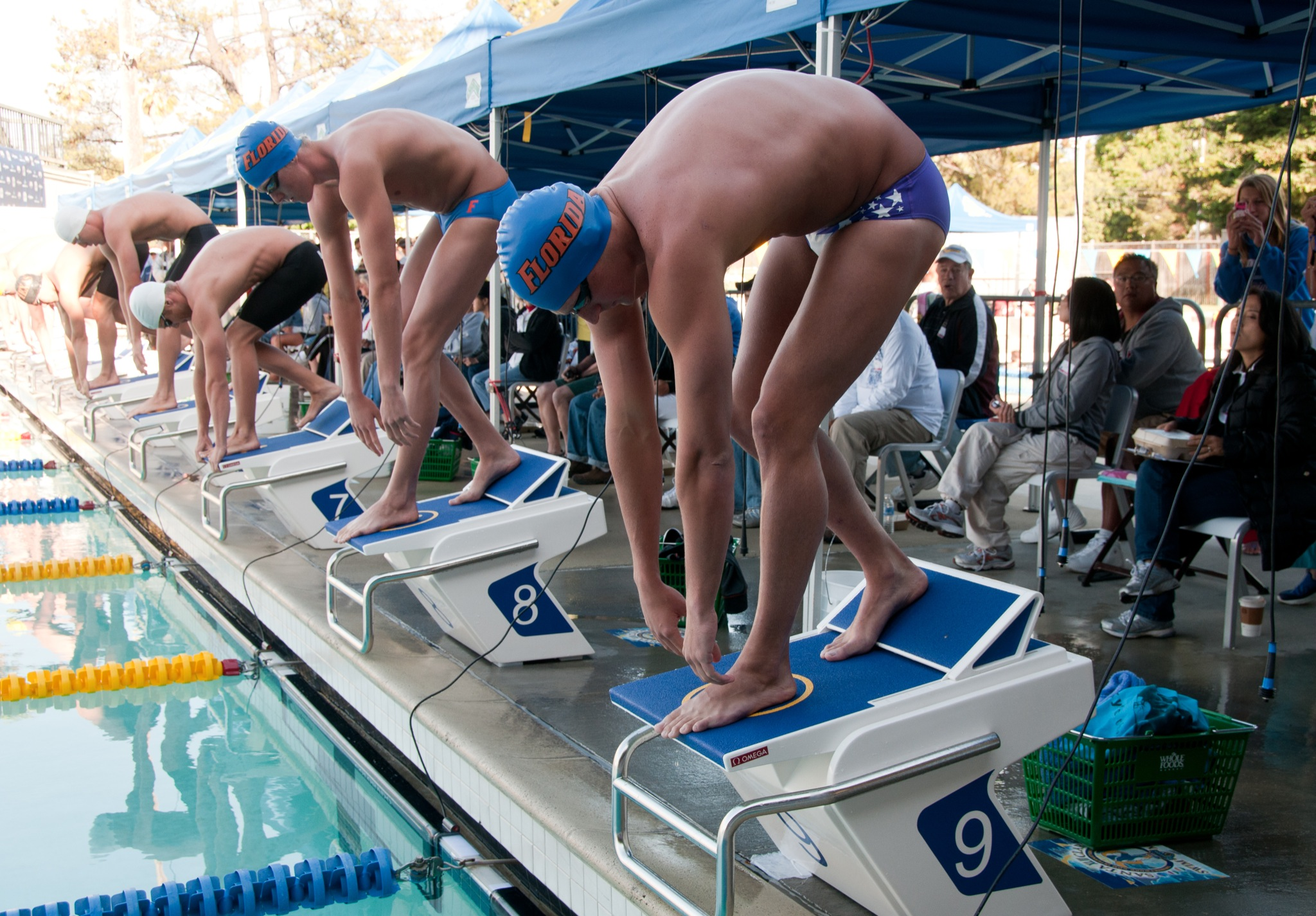
Olympian Ryan Lochte (near) standing on top of the wedged starting blocks. Each swimmer performs a preparatory isometric press by applying downward pressure onto their bent legs. This serves to preload the muscles and helps to make the subsequent dive more powerful.

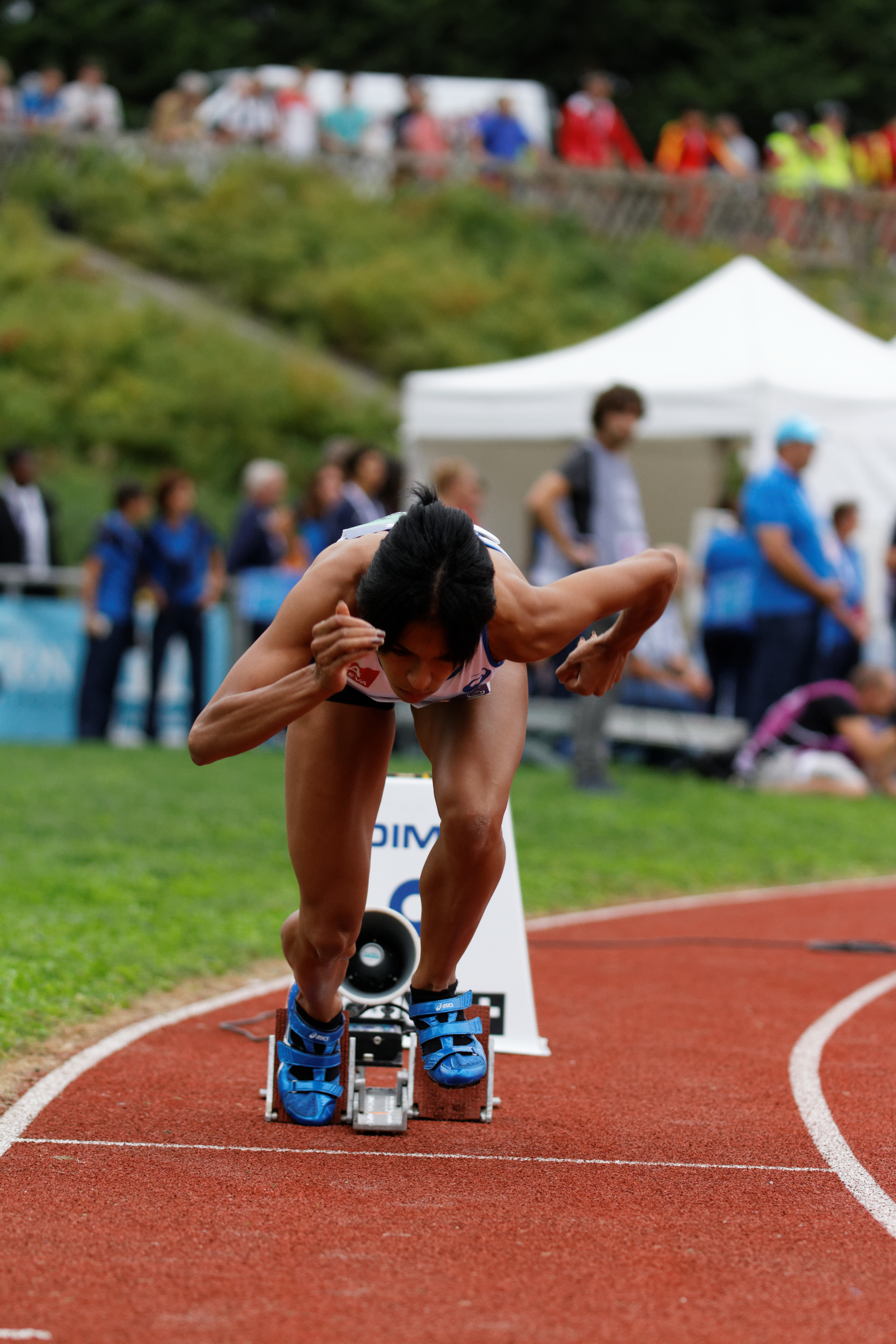
This sprinter's initial crouch in the blocks allowed her to preload her muscles and channel the force generated from this into her first strides forwards.

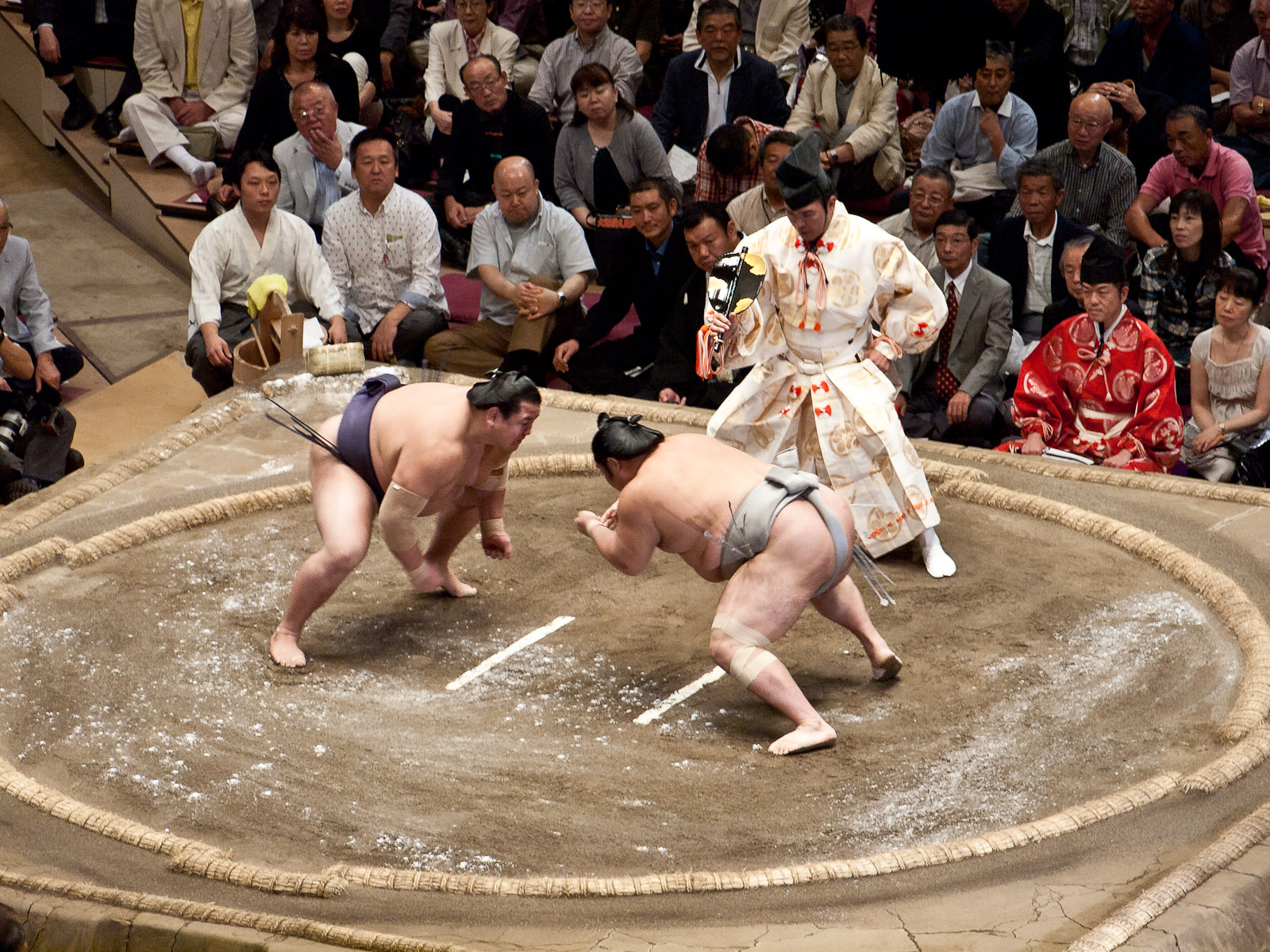
Sumo wrestlers just beginning to charge forwards after crouching down and performing an isometric press. The press enables them to charge into their opponent more powerfully, which is especially useful when the match begins.

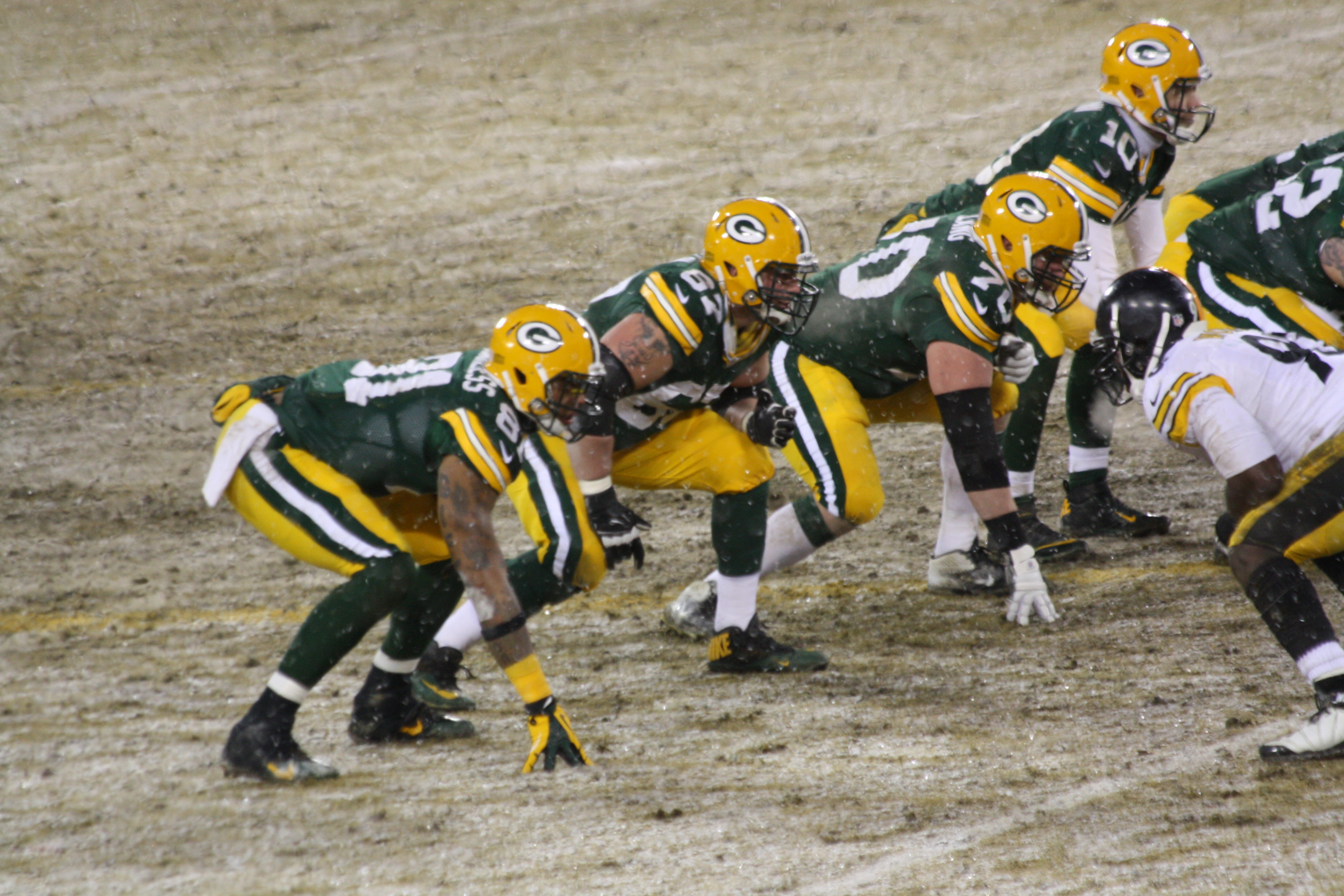
American Football players line up against each other and crouch down into an isometric press position. This allows them to rush forwards more powerfully when the play begins; this is particularly useful in regard to tackling or blocking an opponent.

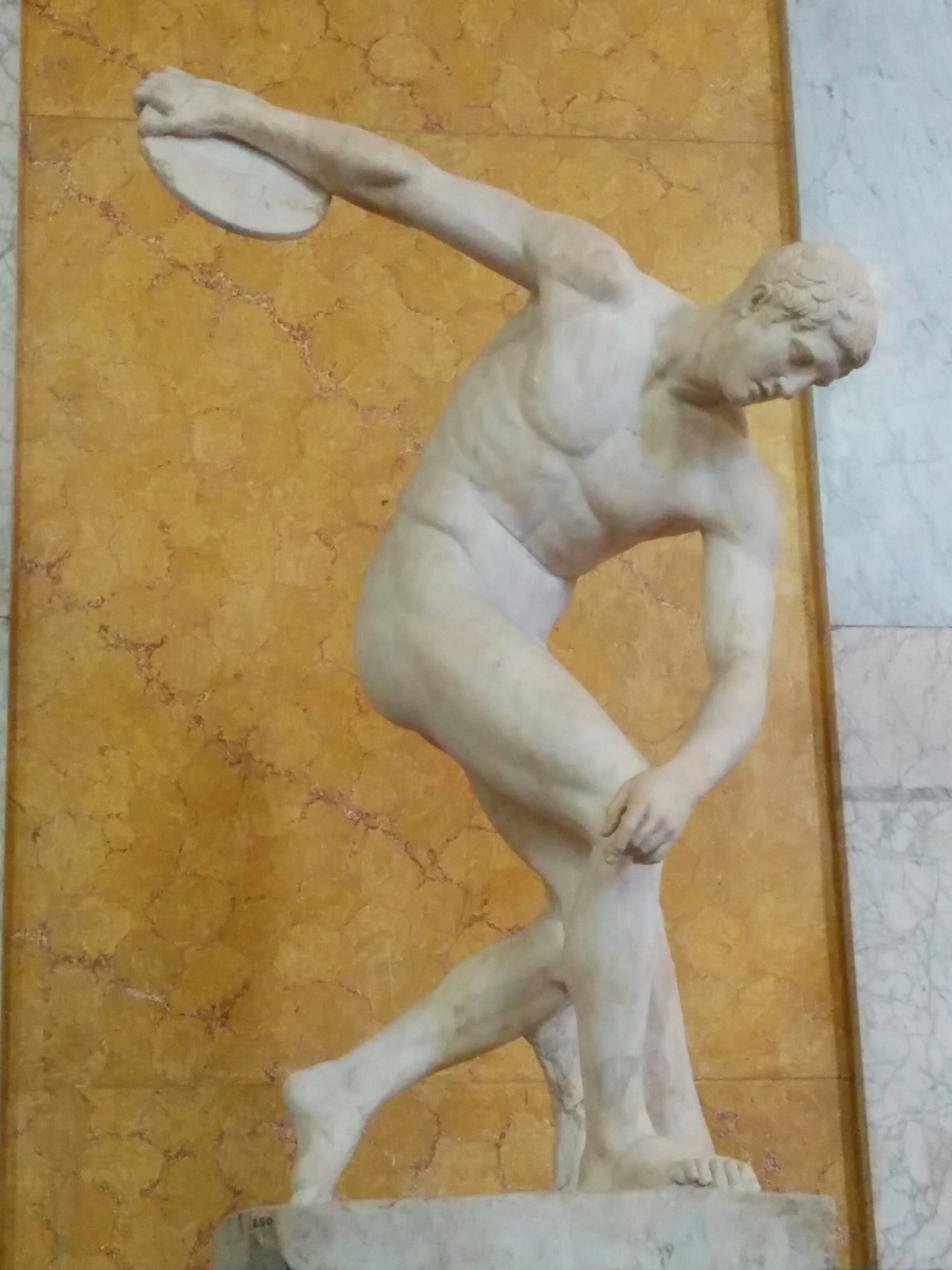
A discus thrower performs an isometric press by applying downward pressure onto his bent right leg. This allows the throw to be performed more powerfully.

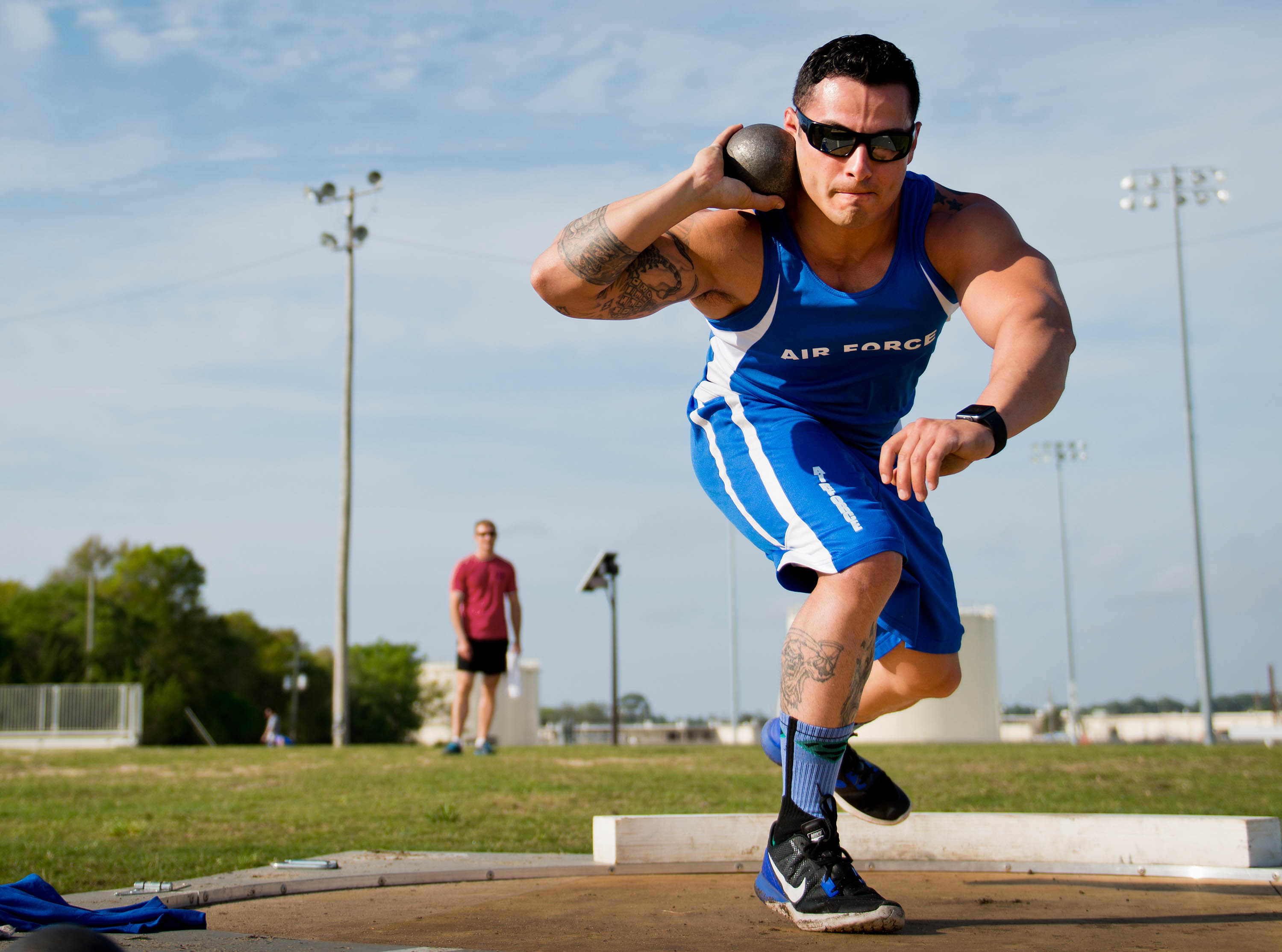
A shot putter performs an isometric press by applying downward pressure onto his bent right leg. This will allow him to turn and spring forwards more powerfully, and channel the muscular force generated by the press into the throw.

== The sport of powerlifting ==
Power training and the sport of powerlifting should be distinguished from one another, although there are some areas where they overlap. Powerlifting, as a sport, is often considered in regard to the three main lifts competitions are judged upon. These are the back squat, the deadlift, and the bench press. These exercises would not ordinarily be considered as power training exercises because they are not usually performed fast enough. The sport of powerlifting acquires its name due to the great amount of force that is required to lift very heavy weights. A major difference between the sport and power training is that in powerlifting competitions it is often required that the joints are locked for a lift to be registered as complete, whereas this would not usually be possible in power training because it would drastically inhibit the dynamic nature of the movements and lead to injury.

== Historical examples of power-type training ==
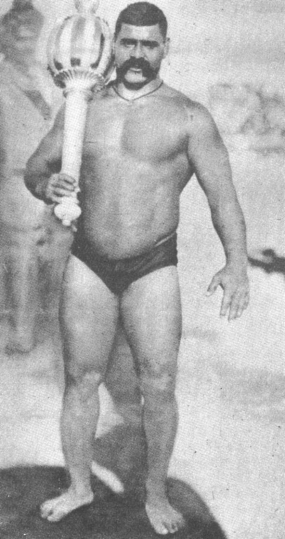
The powerful physique of a world champion wrestler, The Great Gama, who trained using traditional Indian training methods such as heavy club swinging. They focused on developing the musculature of the body in conjunction with the optimisation of joint positions and alignments. The photo, which shows a ceremonial gada, was taken in 1928.

Strive after integrity апd take great pains in your knightly practices: throwing апd pushing stones, dancing апd jumping, fencing апd wrestling, running at the lance апd tournaments, апd courting beautiful women.

— Hans Talhoffer c.1450

- In terms of loaded plyometrics and ballistic training, jumping with weights, either handheld or in the form of armour, and throwing the discus and javelin featured as part of sport and military training regimes in Ancient Greece. Amongst the heaviest known throws in antiquity, was a one handed overhead throw of a stone weighing 140 kg and which had a handle, by the Ancient Greek, Bybon. The record of this throw, which is sometimes translated as a lift, is inscribed onto the stone itself. Throwing a stone was also a popular pastime and military training method in the Medieval ages, with records of it including numerous depictions of a one-handed throw of a stone, roughly the size of a person's head, from the shoulder.
- Ancient Indian power training methods involved heavy club swinging. Where a single club was used, this was called a gada and involved a wooden shaft and a stone top. They could weigh 10-60kg. Two wooden clubs could be used together, one in each hand, and these were called joris. Each one could weigh 15-25kg. Clubs similar to joris were also used in Ancient Persia and called meels. The training effect of these is to develop explosive upper body power through a combination of muscular strengthening and the optimisation of the positions and alignments of the joints, including the spinal vertebrae. In the modern day, such exercises are categorised as ballistic training.

Another exercise used to develop explosive power was a plyometric variation of a deep squat performed on the toes, known as a baithak. A small jump is incorporated at the end of one squat repetition and before the beginning of the next one. The exerciser alternates, first making it a forward jump for one repetition and then a backward jump for the next repetition. The baithak could also involve the wearing of a gar nal, which is a heavy stone ring placed around the neck, supported on the shoulders and held with the hands. One example of a gar nal weighed 54kg.

These training methods were utilised by a group of Muslim wrestlers from, what was then, British India in the early part of the 20th Century from approximately 1900-1930. They dominated all opposition, quickly overpowering and throwing their Western counterparts. Around 1910, the contemporary English wrestling writer, Percy Longhurst, stated 'The Indian system of training... has results beyond the development of great strength; it creates most remarkable powers of endurance while at the same time increasing agility. Gama, Imam Bux, Ahmed Bux - all when in action, impressed by the cat-like activity of their movements, the feline readiness with which their muscles responded to the demands of the moment, which is one of the attributes that make for the winning of falls.' The opinions of the British wrestling and general fitness media were a mixture of admiration for the wrestlers and their training methods, and dismay that Western wrestlers found it difficult to compete and were so quickly beaten.

In religious contexts, the god or person who is representative of the theme of strength is often associated with a club or club-like object. For example, Hanuman has a gada, Hercules has a club, Thor a hammer, and St. Christopher a staff.

- In a similar vein to contrast loading, the Romans trained with weapons which were double the weight of ordinary weapons, in order that when they used the ordinary weapons they would feel lighter and easier to use.
- Gymnastics, in the form of acrobatics, tumbling and rhythmic dance, were practiced widely in Ancient Greece (and with especial devotion in Sparta), Rome, and medieval Europe for the purposes of leisure, sport and military training.
- In terms of heavy lifts, as a test of strength and manhood various societies, such as Celtic and Nordic ones, used to practice stone lifting. This involved lifting very heavy stones, usually over 100 kg, either up to their waist or onto their shoulder. Two examples are the Menzies stone (115 kg) in Scotland and the Husafell Stone (190 kg) in Iceland.

== See also ==
- Ballistic training
- Calisthenics
- Complex training
- Isometric exercise
- Weightlifting
- Plyometrics
- Powerlifting
- Stone lifting
- Street workout
- Strength training
- Unilateral training
- Velocity Based Training (VBT)
- Weight training
