= VBT (disambiguation) =

VBT may refer to:

- Valence bond theory, one of two foundational theories of quantum chemistry
- Vijñāna Bhairava Tantra, the text in Kashmir Shaivism
- Velocity based training, an approach to strength and power training
- Bentonville Municipal Airport, the FAA LIDE code VBT
- Vocabulary-based transformation, a transformation aided by semantic equivalence statements within a controlled vocabulary
- Videobattleturnier, a German-language rap tournament organized by rappers.in from 2007 to 2018
