= Complex training =

Type of strength training

Complex training, also known as contrast training or post-activation potentiation training, involves the integration of strength training and plyometrics in a training system designed to improve explosive power. According to Jace Derwin:

Strength training and plyometric training are both effective measures for increasing athletic performance independent of each other, but a true program designed for power-based athletes needs to incorporate both disciplines. A study done in 2000 in the NSCA's Journal of Strength and Conditioning Research measured three different training protocols: strength training, plyometric training, and a combination of both. The group that used combined methods was the only group that showed significant increases in BOTH strength and power.

Complex training relies upon the performance of a strength exercise, often resistance based, followed by a plyometric exercise. The strength and the plyometric exercise are usually biomechanically similar i.e. they move through similar ranges of movement. For example, a back squat followed by a box jump; or a bench press exercise followed by a jumping clap push up. Such a combination is referred to as a pair or a contrast pair. The resistance based exercise will often be a near maximal effort—about 75–90% of the athlete's maximal lift. The plyometric portion of the training should be completed in an explosive manner. Sets are often used. Between the performance of the strength exercise and the plyometric exercise there is between a 3–12 minute rest period; opinions vary on the most efficient length. As the muscles have been intensely activated by the strength exercise, this develops in the muscles a greater potential to apply force than they would have normally. This added potential to apply force is called post-activation potentiation (PAP). It is the fundamental basis of complex training. This potential to apply force, generated by the strength exercise, is utilised by the athlete in the plyometric exercise to boost their power output to a level greater than it otherwise would have been had they been doing plyometrics alone. In this way, the plyometric exercise can be performed more powerfully. For instance, an athlete may jump higher after they have completed a back squat at 90% maximal lift, had a rest for 3–12 minutes, and then jumped; as opposed to only jumping, where they would not get this improvement. The length of the rest period is chosen to be long enough to allow the athlete to recover after the strength exercise, whilst also being short enough to allow for the high degree of muscle activation to be utilised in the plyometric exercise.

== Rate of force ==
By integrating plyometrics with strength training, there is an added benefit of improving rate of force, the speed with which force is achieved in movement.

== Long term effects of complex training ==
‘The goal of this type of training is to acutely or over long-term training enhance power output in tasks such as jumping, sprinting, and throwing a ball.’

The ambition of complex training is not just to achieve better results in an individual workout but also to condition the athlete to perform more powerfully as a standard. Such an improvement relies upon what Donald Chu calls the ‘neuromuscular connection’: the relationship between the intense activation of the nervous system and enhanced fast-twitch muscle fibre recruitment. However, in terms of long term training effects there is the added dynamic that muscle fibres adjust from slow to fast-twitch. This increases the number of fast-twitch muscle fibres available for recruitment and helps power a given movement.

‘Complex training allows the athlete to work the muscle fibers in conjunction with the nervous system in such a way that the slow-twitch fibers are taught to behave like fast-twitch fibers.’

Such a process is also referred to as muscle fibre type shifting. It is also often discussed in regard to converting muscle fibre types IIa to type IIb. Different training regimes can stimulate different muscle fibre type adaptions. For instance, as a result of their training body builders have a tendency to have relatively more type IIa muscle fibres which allow for forceful, but relatively slow movements. Whereas sprinters, as a result of their training, may have a larger amount of type IIb muscle fibres allowing for forceful, fast movements. Generally, the aim of complex training is to stimulate the athlete to develop more type IIb muscle fibres. This allows for their strength to be expressed quickly, which means greater power generation.

The apparent conversion of type I to type II fibres through training is the alteration of the muscle fibres size and ability to produce force; the percentage of fibres that are type I or type II does not change:

'So training may alter the percentage of a muscle's cross-sectional area that is in a certain fiber type (e.g., hypertrophy of type II fibers), which increases the percentage of an intact muscle's cross-sectional area that is type II, but the percentage of fibers that are type II is not changed.

In the context of rock climbing, and an isometric exercise preceding a plyometric one, Steve Maisch considers that one of the training goals of complex training is to operate at a level of fatigue thereby encouraging the body to learn to recruit from a wider range of muscle fibres in order to be able to apply the appropriate power. Thus, over a period of training, increasing the system strength and power output of the athlete as their body has learnt to recruit a larger number of muscle fibres.

‘The way complex training works, in theory, is that the isometric part of the exercise will cause the muscle fibers which are typically recruited for a given movement to become fatigued. The sport specific plyometric movement which immediately follows the isometric movement will then require the neuromuscular system to recruit new muscle fibers, since the fibers typically recruited are now fatigued. The end result is that more muscle fibers are recruited when performing a particular movement enabling you to jump higher or do a more difficult climbing move.’

Studies on the effectiveness of complex training often last between 4 and 12 weeks and measure such abilities as vertical jump height and sprinting speed. Complex training often compares favourably to resistance only and plyometric only training programmes. There is apparently little information on longer term effects.

== Movements ==
- Plyometric pushup
- Medicine ball plyometrics

== Complex training variations ==
There are numerous variations of complex training. The common set up is designed to stimulate maximum neural engagement and muscle fibre recruitment in a first exercise, either resistance or isometric, before following it up with the performance of a second exercise which is performed at significantly increased speed. The second exercise can often be categorised as being either plyometric or ballistic. It is designed to both utilise the PAP effect from the first exercise whilst also further increasing neural activation and muscle fibre recruitment. As a result, this enhances the athlete's ability to move powerfully.

=== Combat athletics ===
Complex training can be used by combat athletes such as boxers and martial artists in order to improve their performance. For instance, boxers may use complex training in order to increase their punching power. This may involve some sport specific variations, such as the plyometric segment of the training being punching. For example, a boxer may use a cable pulley machine to add resistance to their punches, have a rest for somewhere between 30 and 240 seconds, and then practice explosive punching without any resistance on a punchbag.

=== Weight lifting ===
A version of complex training can be used in weight lifting; it is also referred to as contrast loading. A heavy set of lifting is followed by a lighter set of lifting; both sets should be performed in an explosive manner. The increased activation of the nervous system and recruitment of muscle fibres in the heavy set allows for the lighter set to be performed in a more powerful and explosive manner.

Weight lifting can effectively demonstrate the effects of post-activation potentiation. For example, if a person lifts a light weight, and then lifts a heavy weight, before lifting the light weight again, the light weight will be relatively easier to lift and feel lighter the second time it has been lifted. Because the intense activation of the nervous system and correspondent recruitment of muscle fibres which occurred in conjunction with the heavy lift has allowed the person to perform more powerful movements, and the weight therefore feels relatively lighter. Another resistance based explanation involves the example of heavy suitcase, light suitcase i.e. after lifting a heavy suitcase, a person lifts a similar size, but light suitcase with no idea what is in it; as the person has just been carrying a heavy suitcase, their level of power application is well in excess of what is required to lift the light suitcase and it flies off the floor.

=== Rock climbing ===
Complex training may be utilised by rock climbers in order to develop their ability to apply power quickly either in terms of dynamic movement or in the securing of holds. A complex training programme for rock climbers may be very sports specific. Notably, the first resistance exercise is often, but not necessarily, replaced with an isometric exercise or hold, before being followed by a dynamic power exercise. For instance, weighted dead hangs followed by doubles on the campus board. Whilst this is a sports specific variation, the underlying ambition is the same as with other forms of complex training; to maximally stimulate the nervous system whilst increasingly recruiting fast-twitch muscle fibres in order to improve the ability to apply power.

=== Accentuated eccentric loading (AEL) ===
It is possible to combine the effects of two exercises within a complex training modality into one explosive movement. AEL involves overloading the eccentric phase of a movement with a resistance that is immediately released for a lighter, more explosive concentric phase. AEL is based on the concept that muscles contracting eccentrically have a greater tolerance for load than they do when contracting concentrically or isometrically. An early study on AEL showed improvements in vertical jump performance and lower-body strength, but did not show significant improvements in change of direction and sprint performance.

== See also ==
- Ballistic training
- Calisthenics
- Plyometrics
- Power training
- Muscle fibers
- Strength training
- Unilateral training
