= SAID principle =

Principle in physical training

In physical rehabilitation and sports training, the SAID principle asserts that the human body adapts specifically to imposed demands. It demonstrates that, given stressors on the human system, there will be a Specific Adaptation to Imposed Demands (SAID). For example, by only doing pull-ups on the same regular pull-up bar, the body becomes adapted to this specific physical demand, but not necessarily to other climbing patterns or environments.

In 1958, Berkeley Professor of Physical Education Franklin M. Henry proposed the "Specificity Hypothesis of Motor Learning".

== See also ==
- Strength training
- Supercompensation
- Velocity Based Training (VBT)
