= Unilateral training =

Single limb physical exercise

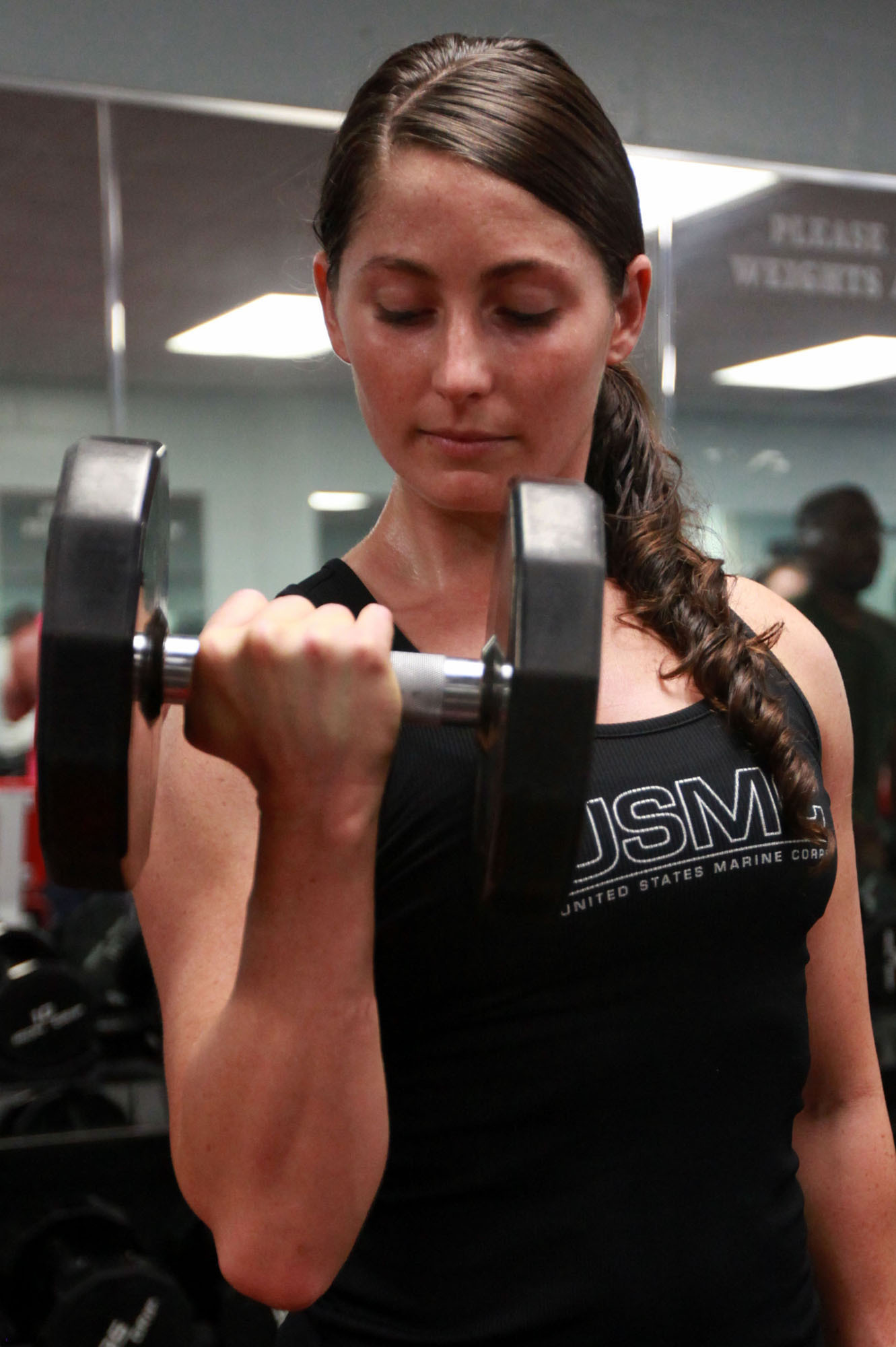
A unilateral bicep curl with a dumbbell.

Unilateral training involves the performance of physical exercises using one limb instead of two. Such exercises should be considered as being distinct from bilateral, two limbed, exercises. For example, unilateral squats use one leg, and bilateral squats use two legs. A unilateral bench press uses one arm and a bilateral bench press two arms. Depending on the exercise, this may also entail using different equipment i.e. a dumbbell instead of a barbell. Unilateral exercise is commonly involved in comprehensive training regimes and especially those of professional sports people and athletes. Usually it is used in addition to bilateral training as opposed to instead of it. Unilateral training can yield numerous benefits including improving a person's muscle balance between the left and right sides of their body, improving their sense of balance, and helping to avoid or rehabilitate injury.

== Advantages ==
=== Sports specificity ===
Many sports require participants to perform actions with one limb instead of two. For example, a football player may kick the ball while standing on one leg, and a tennis player may hit the ball using a one-handed swing of their racket. The strengthening of the limbs in a unilateral fashion can help the players to perform these actions more effectively than if the limbs were trained in a bilateral fashion. This is because the unilateral action more closely resembles the sporting action, and, based upon the principle of specificity, benefits gained from it are more transferable to the performance of the sporting action. Significantly, running is considered to be a unilateral action as it involves alternating between using the legs singly. Walking is also sometimes considered to be a unilateral action for this reason although it involves a bilateral element. Quick changes of direction during sport are also frequently performed in a unilateral manner.

=== Muscle training focus ===
As unilateral exercises emphasise muscle use in a different way to bilateral exercises, and thereby alter the ratio in which different muscles are engaged, they can be selected in order to focus on training particular muscles. For example, a one-legged squat activates the gluteus medius more than a rear foot elevated split squat.

=== Sense of balance ===
Unilateral exercises may require a person to try harder to maintain their sense of balance during the exercise. As a result, their sense of balance overall may improve. This is especially the case in regard to single leg exercises. On this basis, unilateral exercises are considered to be highly functional, in that the improved sense of balance that they help to develop, transfers well to most sports and athletics where the participants are more likely to need to balance on one leg and perform an action, or move through a range of movement using only one leg as a base of support.

=== Muscle balance ===
Some people may have a problematic muscle imbalance between the different sides of their body, including the limbs, meaning one side is excessively stronger than the other. This generally means that performance is impeded and the risk of injury is increased. Such an imbalance may be the result of lifestyle factors, such as sitting at a computer using a mouse, or from training in an imbalanced way, or for other reasons. It may not be resolved by bilateral training as it may continue during the exercise. With unilateral training, however, the person definitely performs the same amount of work with either side of their body and this can therefore mean that the muscle imbalance is resolved. For example, if a person's right leg is stronger than their left leg, and it therefore performs 60% of the work in a bilateral squat, and the left leg 40%, then the bilateral squat will not fix the imbalance. Moreover, even if the percentage discrepancy remained the same, as their overall strength increased, the discrepancy in terms of how much force could be applied would increase. Unilateral squats performed alternately would, however, ensure that each leg was performing the same amount of work, meaning that the strength of each leg becomes more similar to the strength of the other leg, and the muscle imbalance is reduced. As it is reduced, performance improves and the risk of injury is reduced.

=== Core strength ===
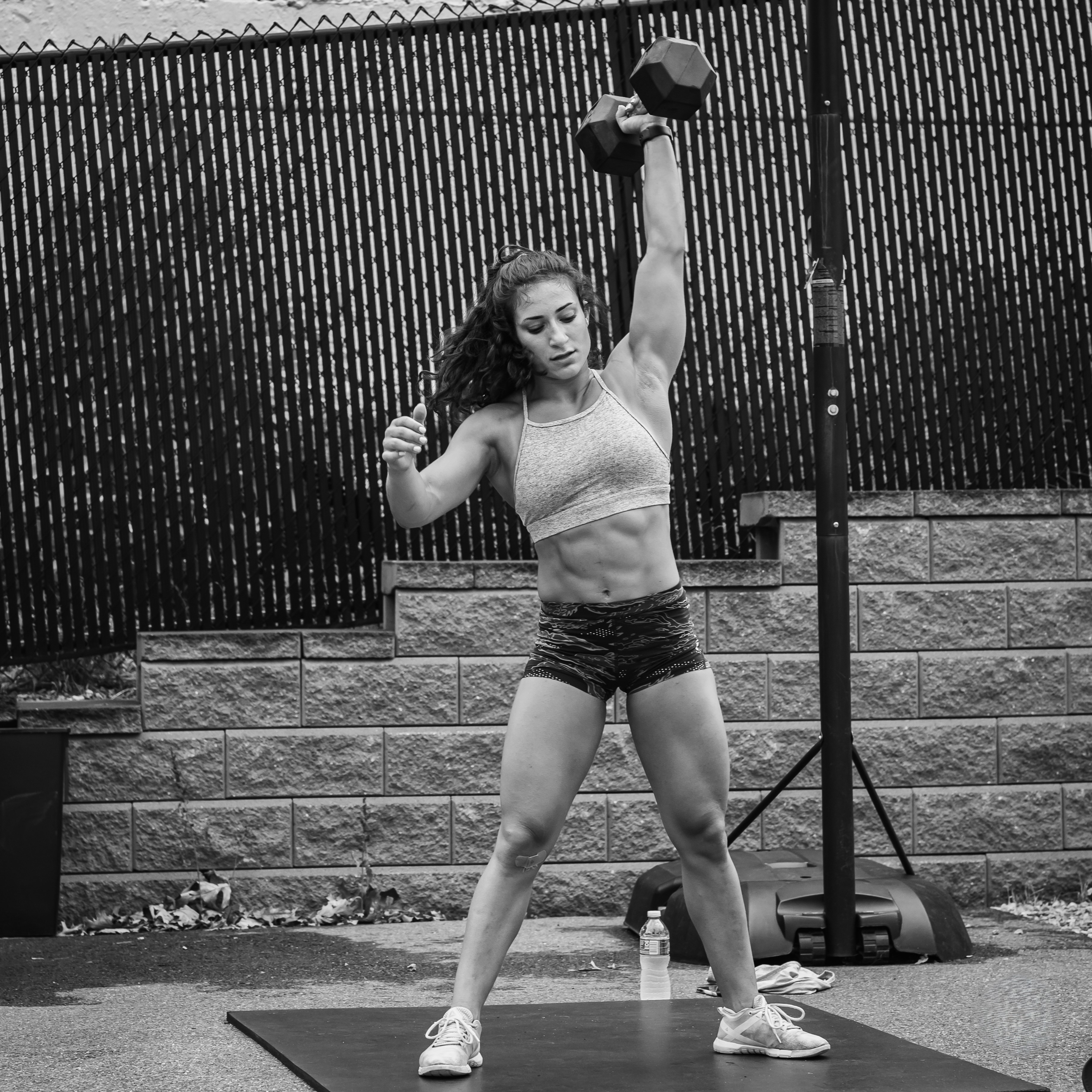
A unilateral overhead press.

Due to the fact that unilateral exercises are usually performed more to one side than the other, relative to a person's centre of mass, their performance necessitates different, and generally increased, core activity in order to provide the appropriate stability during the exercise. For example, a one-handed lift of a weight over a person's head, requires them to stabilise their core in a different way than if they were lifting a barbell over their head with two-hands. Generally, this means that they have to work harder to stabilise the weight and themselves during the lift, meaning greater levels of core activation.

=== Injury prevention ===
As unilateral exercises can improve a person's sense of balance, correct muscle imbalances and improve the harmonious functioning of the muscular system, and transfer effectively to the performance of sports specific movements, they can also help to prevent injury as the practitioner becomes more capable and stronger in general, than if they only performed bilateral exercises.

=== Rehabilitation ===
Unilateral exercises may be used in rehabilitation programmes. For example, single leg balances may be used to strengthen someone's ankle after they recover from an injury and thereby help to restore their ability to balance.

== Disadvantages ==
If unilateral exercises are used instead of bilateral exercises, or vice versa, then this can yield negative training outcomes overall. This is because even though unilateral and bilateral exercises may yield similar results, there can also be significant differences and the use of one and not the other may mean potentially advantageous outcomes are lost. For example, the incorporation of a unilateral barbell squat into a training regime, but not a bilateral barbell squat, may mean that only half the weight can be lifted. And so while the legs may be exercised to a similar amount in both types of squat, in the bilateral squat the core is forced to work significantly harder which can lead to the achievement of greater levels of core strength. The most common solution is to incorporate both bilateral and unilateral exercises in a training regime in order to gain the advantages of both types of exercise. The ratio of unilateral to bilateral exercises can be adjusted based upon the specific requirements of the training regime.

== Unilateral training and the cross education effect ==
When a person moves a limb they will naturally move the other paired limb in tandem, in order to improve their overall sense of balance. As well as balancing the spatial positioning of the limbs, this involves balancing the agonist and antagonist forces of the limbs. These co-activating forces relate to a person’s centre of mass where the forces towards and away from the centre are approximately even and the person is in a state of postural equilibrium. This can be meant in regard to either static postures or dynamic movements. When a person moves, their centre of mass moves also in a unified process. The ongoing stabilisation and reinforcement of the centre of mass, has a reciprocal benefit in that it enables the limbs to move from a more stable platform and thereby improves the efficiency of their movement. Unilateral exercises can be particularly effective in improving a person’s ability to balance.

In contrast to whole body balance, the cross education effect is considered primarily in regard to situations where one limb is moving, and the other limb concurrently activates but with limited, if any, perceptible movement. For example, a person is standing and they lift up their left arm while not moving their right. Even though the right arm does not perceptibly move, it is still activated by the movement of the left arm. The same phenomena applies for any form of limb movement, in that the other limb will also be activated.

A form of unilateral training can be utilised which involves only the movement of one limb, with the other limb being non-moving. However, the non-trained limb also becomes stronger due to the cross education effect. Research conducted by Munn and colleagues, assessed that the untrained limb strengthened on average by 7.8% over a period of training, which is 35.1% of the strength gain experienced by the limb actually being trained. How the nervous system activates in conjunction with the moving limb is considered to be of particular importance in understanding the underlying causes of the effect, which are not as of yet fully understood. In situations whereby one limb cannot be moved for some reason, the cross education effect can be used to strengthen it, improve agility, and prevent muscle atrophy etc. This can make it useful for the rehabilitation of sports injury, training people with a lateral imbalance of motor skills, or mobility impairments such as that suffered by stroke victims who may not be able to use one side of their body.

== See also ==
- Ballistic training
- Calisthenics
- Physical exercise
- Power training
- Strength training
- Weight training
