= Velocity based training =

Approach to strength and power training

Velocity based training (VBT) is a modern approach to strength training and power training which utilises velocity tracking technology to provide rich objective data as a means to motivate and support real-time adjustments in an athlete's training plan. Typical strength and power programming and periodisation plans rely on the manipulation of reps, sets and loads as a means to calibrate training stressors in the pursuit of specific adaptations. Since the late 1990s, innovations in bar speed monitoring technology has brought velocity based training closer to the mainstream as the range of hardware and software solutions for measuring exercise velocities have become easier to use and more affordable. Velocity based training has a wide range of use cases and applications in strength and conditioning. These include barbell sports such as powerlifting and Olympic weightlifting and Crossfit, as well as rock climbing. Velocity based training is widely adopted across professional sporting clubs, with the data supporting many periodisation decisions for coaches in the weight room and on the field.

Most commonly, velocity based training is used on compound strength and power movements such as squats, deadlifts, bench press and the olympic lifting variations. Values such as mean velocity, mean propulsive velocity and peak velocity are recorded in metres per second (m/s) and logged over time to monitor performance and fatigue levels in individual athletes or across teams or cohorts.

== Physiology of velocity based training ==
Velocity Based Training is built on the training principle of intent to move and Newton's second law of motion.

=== Intent to Move ===
When training for strength and power, athlete should aim to apply as much intent as possible to their movements. By trying to lift weights as explosively as possible, an athlete will accelerate and increase the recruitment of their largest, most powerful type II motor units through the Henneman Size Principle. This higher effort and intent in training in turn increases rate of force development, preferential type II fibre hypertrophy through the SAID principle.

Until recently, tracking this intent relied on a keen coaches eye and subjective feedback methods. The ability to track and monitor objective metrics such as velocity and power has become a key coaching tool for providing motivation to athletes, improving training adaptations and reinforcing this higher intent to training.

=== The load velocity profile ===
In most traditional strength movements, as the amount of load an athlete aims to lift increases, the velocity at which they are able to move decreases. The relationship between load and velocity follow a predictable and consistent linear pattern. The stability of this load velocity relationship has made Velocity Based Training a useful tool to be able to predict and estimate strength levels, fatigue and readiness to train.

=== The load power profile ===
Similarly to the velocity profile, power and load share a stable relationship, however its shape is a single factor polynomial, with the point of peak power occurring between 30 and 80% of 1RM varying based on the exercise and individual.

=== Minimum velocity threshold ===
The minimum velocity threshold (MVT) is the slowest velocity at which a repetition can be completed for a given exercise. This value is therefore synonymous with the 1 repetition maximum, a common test and indication of an athletes strength levels and progress in the gym. The MVT has been shown to be consistent for a number of common strength training exercises, although the homogeneity of the research cohorts, variations in lifting technique and differences in velocity values given by different tracking technologies used across exercises may suggest a wider level of individual variation in the minimum velocity values than is currently presented.

== Velocity based training use cases ==
Velocity based training has many varied uses and applications in training. While the use of standardised speed zones have been historically popular for the pursuit of specific training qualities, recent research has highlighted that high variations can exist between individuals, and therefore individualisation of load velocity profiling and VBT program design can lead to superior training adaptations.

=== Feedback and motivation ===
By using velocity as a marker of quality in strength training, coaches and athletes can take this feedback to motivate and compete on these metrics.

Two studies showed that providing real-time objective feedback to athletes could lead to instant improvements in jump performance and ultimately greater jump improvements over 6 weeks of training by simply displaying jump performance to the athletes as they completed their repetitions. A further study utilised velocity feedback on the squat exercise in a group of rugby players and showed that those athletes who were exposed to their velocity data during the training session achieved greater improvements in speed and power following the training plan. The addition of an objective target, in this case higher velocity, leads to increases in athlete intrinsic motivation as they pursue personal bests or compete with teammates in the gym environment. This extra motivation can be especially valuable for athletes in certain sports and demographics where strength training can be seen as monotonous.

=== Real-time fatigue monitoring ===
When strength training, sets with higher repetition ranges lead to higher levels of muscle damage, metabolite build up and greater fatigue effects. This fatigue often presents itself in the form of decreasing velocity across a training set or session. Through the use of velocity monitoring, coaches and athletes can monitor, in real-time, the amount of fatigue that is accumulating as a product of velocity decrement across a set. Velocity stops can be used to limit the amount of velocity loss that is allowed through either a percentage cut off or by setting a limit on how slowly an athlete is allowed to complete a repetition before they must end their set and begin a rest period. A velocity stop of 20% from the fastest repetition is commonly used to help athletes avoid the negative effects of consistent training to failure. Even tighter velocity stops of 5-10% are also common place during tapering or when chasing specific power adaptations. While a velocity loss of 30% and above may have benefits in increasing hypertrophy, this high volume, high fatigue approach to training does also lead to greater type 1 muscle fibre hypertrophy.

=== Auto-regulation ===
Physical performance levels, also known as readiness, are known to fluctuate wildly on a daily or even hourly basis. Lifestyle stressors, sleep quality, nutrition, hormonal fluctuation and general arousal levels can have a significant impact on strength, power, speed and fitness. These variations can make standardised percentage based training programs difficult to implement and often suboptimal for helping athletes maximise their performance over time.

Coaches, sporting organisations and individual athletes typically monitor their daily readiness levels in order to auto-regulate their training loads and volumes. Technologies such as heart rate variability monitoring, GPS data, blood oxygen sensors, along with subjective readiness questionnaires and regular performance testing is used to adjust and calibrate the optimal training stresses on a daily basis.

Velocity tracking can be a vital tool in the auto-regulation of training too. As an athlete trains, coaches can receive and analyse training data for their warm up sets, comparing their velocity and power outputs relative to individual testing baselines or recent contextual training data. Drops in velocity relative to normal during these warm up sets can signify fatigue or low readiness to train, prompting intervention and training load adjustments to match this low readiness to train.

=== Testing and profiling ===
Due to the stable, linear relationship between velocity and load, the load velocity profile can be used to profile an athlete's performance on given exercises over time to track progress and training effectiveness. Many of these testing and profiling scores can be extracted from the standard training process without the need for dedicated testing events. The use of spreadsheet formulas allow coaches to collect these values on a consistent basis to monitor trends in strength and power over time.

1 Repetition Maximum (1RM). For some of the most common strength training exercises, standardised values have been developed for estimating an athletes maximum strength levels by extending an athletes load velocity profile for a given exercise and finding its intersection with the point of minimum velocity threshold. This value can be calculated using simple spreadsheet calculations and then logged over time. Many studies have found this to be a strongly linked correlation to actual 1RM values.

Vzero. An alternative metric to the 1RM calculation, Vzero calculates the intersection between the linear load velocity profile and a theoretical velocity of 0 m/s. This can be used as a more general strength tracking value and has better utility for exercises and variations with less reliable 1RM minimum velocity threshold relationships.

Peak Power. Training at loads that elicit peak power is a common and desirable objective in many sports. Many velocity tracking technologies calculate peak and mean power levels providing values in absolute terms and relative to an athlete's bodyweight. This can then be used to adjust training loads in order to maximise power output on every given rep, optimising the training stimulus on any given training day. Tracking peak power relative to bodyweight can provide valuable insights especially for athletes who may be gaining or losing weight in weight class sports or during off-season periods.

== Velocity based training devices and technology ==
There are a range of laboratory based and commercially available technologies that offer a range of features and options for tracking velocity in the gym.

=== Lab based 3D motion capture ===
Largely considered the gold standard, large multi-camera, high frame rate systems can accurately track and measure movements in 3D space, giving a high precision picture of bar position, bar path, velocity and power metrics. Whilst these systems are incredibly accurate, their cost, size and technical demands in operation make them more suited for academic purposes and have limited application in day-to-day training for the vast majority gym settings.

=== Multi-camera systems ===
With advancements in camera precision and processor capacity, 3D motion sensing systems have become more widely adopted through industries such as virtual reality phone applications, video gaming and driving autonomy.

These same advancements have led to the development of gym and health based velocity and motion tracking systems. These hardware systems are often mounted into a squat rack and programmed to automatically detect and trace athlete movements, providing feedback of movement velocity, range of motion and more.

=== Linear Positional Transducers ===
One of the earliest technologies and still one of the most popular to be used in elite sport, a device containing a rotary encoder and string spool is connected to the training implement, unspooling during movement. As this string uncoils and retracts, it transmits positional data to a digital display or smart device, calculating displacement, velocity and power outputs.

Linear positional transducers are a valid and reliable method for measuring bar speed and velocity. Some technologies offer X-axis correction to correct for device placement relative to the implement. This offers the ability to measure and display bar path data, while accounting for variance in placement of the device relative to the plane of the movement.

=== Smart phone applications ===
With recent advances in phone technology, camera quality, and phone computational power, the ability to track movements via computer vision without the need for additional hardware has become more widespread. A number of applications are commercially available at affordable prices and even completely free increasing the accessibility of velocity based training beyond elite and professional sporting contexts. These applications already offer high levels of validity and reliability for bar path, velocity, range of motion, and power metrics. The affordability, easy of use and reliability of the data makes smartphone applications an appealing option for coaches and athletes at every level.

=== Accelerometers, IMUs and wearable technology ===
Wearable technology incorporating multi-axis accelerometry or inertial motion units (IMU) are common place in a broad range of health and fitness tracking applications. Various commercially available wearable and bar mounted accelerometer devices have been validated to measure and track velocity in real time across a range of exercises. Due to their simpler construction and smaller size compared to positional transducers, these units have had a somewhat wider adoption in the fitness world outside elite sport due to portability, convenience and cost. Wearable devices such as the Apple Watch have also been explored for their potential to measure VBT, demonstrating promising applications in tracking movement velocity during resistance exercises. While IMUs have been found to be reliable and valid, some inconsistency at slow movement speeds along with interference from bar vibration at high speeds can be problematic.

== See also ==
- Strength and Conditioning Coach
- Strength training
- Power training
- Ballistic training
- Plyometrics
- Sports periodisation
- Weightlifting
- Powerlifting
- CrossFit
- Programming & Periodization
