= Strength and conditioning coach =

Sports profession

A strength and conditioning coach (also known as an S&C coach) is a physical performance professional who uses exercise prescription to improve the performance of competitive athletes or athletic teams. This is achieved through the combination of strength training, aerobic conditioning, and other methods.

Unlike an athletic trainer, a strength and conditioning coach is focused primarily on sport performance. The coach helps athletes with injury prevention, through strengthening and coaching of movement mechanics within a sport. While a personal trainer may work with individuals of all fitness levels and focus on health or fitness, strength and conditioning coaches focus on competitive athletes and improving performance in a specific sport. The qualifications for the three professions are not interchangeable, and both strength and conditioning coaches and athletic trainers have more stringent educational requirements than personal trainers.

== Employment characteristics ==
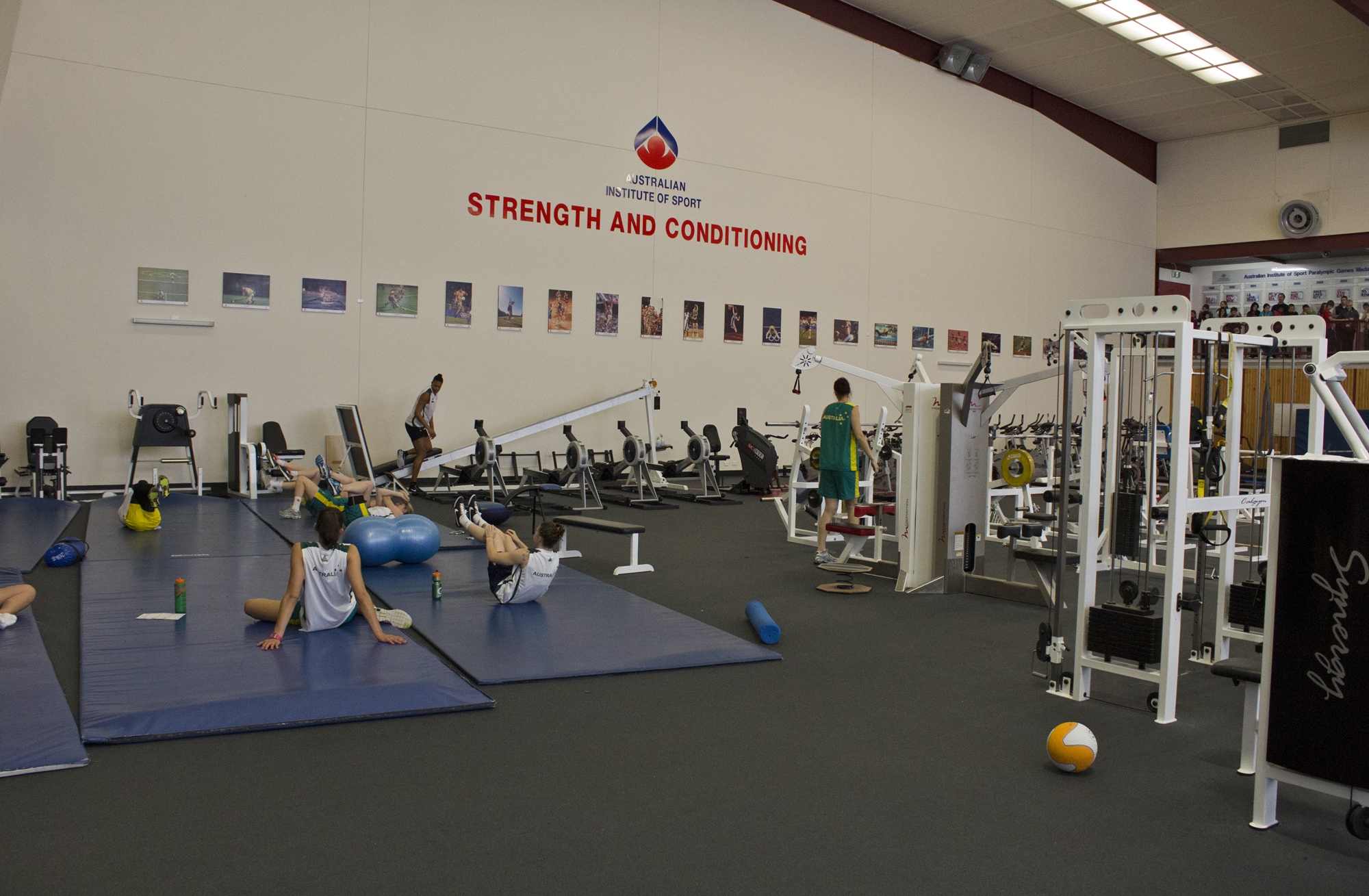
A strength and conditioning gym

Strength and conditioning coaches are often employed by higher education institutions and professional athletic teams.

In the private sector, strength and conditioning coaches can work in performance gyms or open their own practice where amateur and professional athletes can train. This is a popular option for athletes during their off-season when access to official team facilities is less convenient. Furthermore, strength and conditioning coaches can work remotely with clients/athletes of all experience levels through "online coaching" which is becoming increasingly popular.

Strength and conditioning coaches have the option to specialize in a particular sports team, type of performance, training type, training philosophy, or work in the collegiate level, where they are assigned a sport. The general description and duty of a strength and conditioning coach is to develop an exercise prescription plan that modulates aerobic, resistance, and/or flexibility training to suit the metabolic and physical demands of the sport in question. With aerobic exercise prescription, strength and conditioning coaches determine the type, duration, and frequency of each exercise. For resistance exercise prescription, the type of exercise, total session volume, rest period, frequency, intensity and velocity are determined. They may also be involved in prescription of stretching routines or other approaches. Nutrition and medical consultation are not within their scope of practice and training qualifications.

== Qualification standards ==
=== United States ===
In the US, The National Strength and Conditioning Association offers a Certified Strength and Conditioning Specialist (CSCS) qualification that is often considered the gold standard for positions in the field. A bachelor's degree is a prerequisite for the CSCS and it is encouraged to attain such degree in majors that are related to exercise science due to the competitiveness of the field.

The Collegiate Strength & Conditioning Coaches association also offers certification exclusive to the collegiate and professional-level strength and conditioning coach. This certification is known as Strength & Conditioning Coach Certified (SCCC) and requires a bachelor's degree and a 640-hour internship in addition to passing the certification exam.

=== United Kingdom ===
Strength and conditioning in the UK is generally overseen by The United Kingdom Strength and Conditioning Association (UKSCA) and The Chartered Institute for the Management of Sport and Physical Activity (CIMSPA) . Both organisations provide regulations and standards for employers and professionals. A UKSCA membership and Bachelor's degree in sport and exercise science are generally accepted by many professional sports clubs as prerequisites for strength and conditioning positions. As well as the UKSCA and CIMSPA, 1st4sport Qualifications offer standardised training in accordance with other official National Governing Body qualifications.

=== Worldwide ===
On a global scale, there are several recognized certifications. The Australian Strength and Conditioning Association (ASCA) offers a range of coaching qualifications that will be acceptable by most employers. The International Universities Strength and Conditioning Association (IUSCA) also offers a Degree Accreditation, that is awarded by universities delivering Bachelor degrees in S&C and Sport Science.

== Effectiveness ==
The implementation of effective strength and conditioning programmes has led to an increase in speed and strength. Research has demonstrated that not only does training improve performance but incorrect training (distance running, a slow-twitch muscle fiber activity, in football athletes with fast-twitch characteristics) can cause decrements to performance. Using techniques such as velocity based training and plyometrics in some high-power athletes and sports-specific movements in others, strength coaches may improve physical function and athletic performance while potentially lowering the risk of some sporting injuries.
