= Bybon =

Ancient Greek athlete

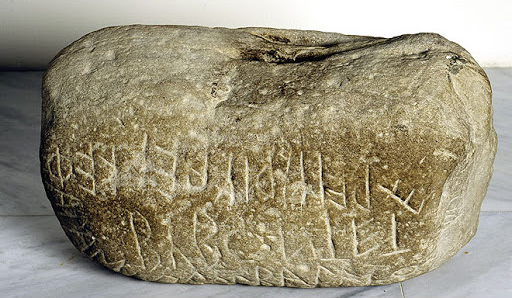
The Bybon sandstone

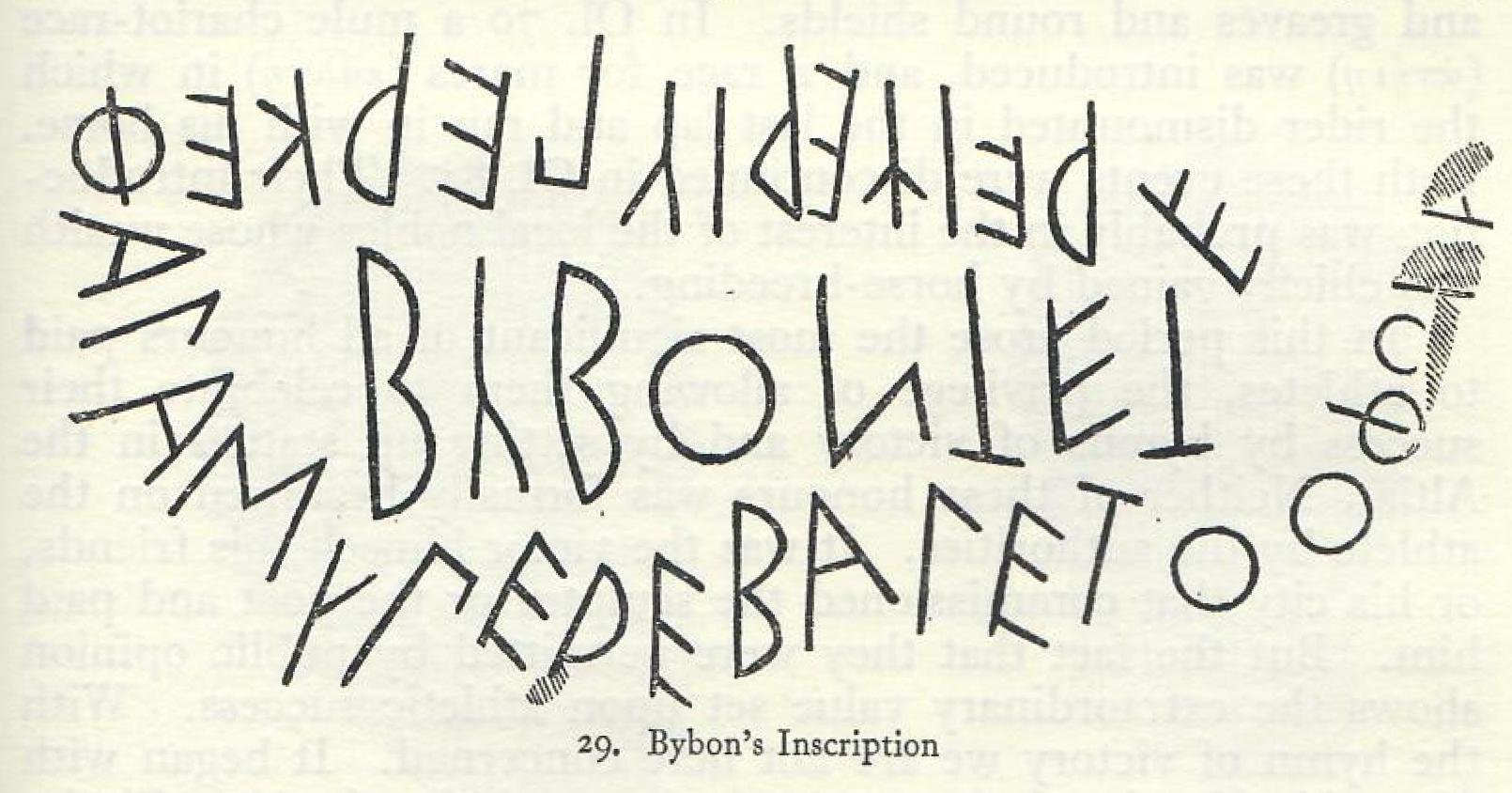
The inscription on the stone

Bybon was an athlete who lived in Ancient Greece during the early 6th century BC.

The only known information of him comes from an Ancient Greek inscription bearing his name on a sandstone in Olympia, Greece. The stone which weighs 143.5 kilograms (316 lb) contains two deep notches carved out of it, forming a handle so that the stone could be used as a free weight. It reads:

ΒΥΒΟΝ ΤΕΤΕΡΕΙ ΧΕΡΙ [sic] ΥΠΕΡ ΚΕΦΑΛΑΣ ΥΠΕΡΕΒΑΛΕΤΟ ΟΦΟΛΑ
Bybon, son of Phola, has lifted me over [his] head with one hand. (Note: Although the "one-arm lift" aspect of the feat is heavily disputed by many strength historians, including Gardinier himself, it is agreed that Bybon might have successfully cleared it off the floor and pressed it overhead with both arms, especially taking good use of the carved out handles.)

Historian E. Norman Gardinier translates the word "lifted" as "threw." In regards to the athletic culture in which such a throw may have been made, he states:
"The typical athlete of the period, as we know him from the records and from the black-figured vases, was the strongman, wrestler, boxer, or pankratiast. Many stories were told of their strength. One of them, named Bybon, left behind at Olympia an interesting record. It is a block of red sandstone weighing 316 lb., and on it is inscribed the statement that he threw it over his head with one hand".

The stone is currently on display at the Archaeological Museum of Olympia.

== See also ==
- Ballistic training
- Stone lifting
- History of physical training and fitness
