= General physical preparedness =

Level of athletic conditioning

General Physical Preparation, also known as GPP, lays the groundwork for later Specific Physical Preparation, or SPP. In the GPP phase, athletes work on general conditioning to improve strength, speed, endurance, flexibility, structure and skill. GPP is generally performed in the off-season, with a lower level of GPP-maintenance during the season, when SPP is being pursued. GPP helps prevent imbalances and boredom with both specific and non-specific exercises by conditioning the body to work.

== Purpose ==
GPP is the initial stage of training. It starts every cycle of training from the macro-, meso- and microcycle after restoration and recovery. It consists primarily of general preparatory and some specialized conditioning exercises to work all the major muscles and joints. This preparation prepares the athlete for the more intense training such as explosive plyometrics. This period is also used for rehabilitation of injured muscles and joints, strengthening or bringing up to par the lagging muscles and improvement of technique.

== Specific example ==
For the high-level and elite athlete in endurance sport like cycling or long distance trail, GPP counts more or less for 70-80% of the training time through Long Slow Distance.
