= Ballistic training =

Maximal acceleration of weight for exercise

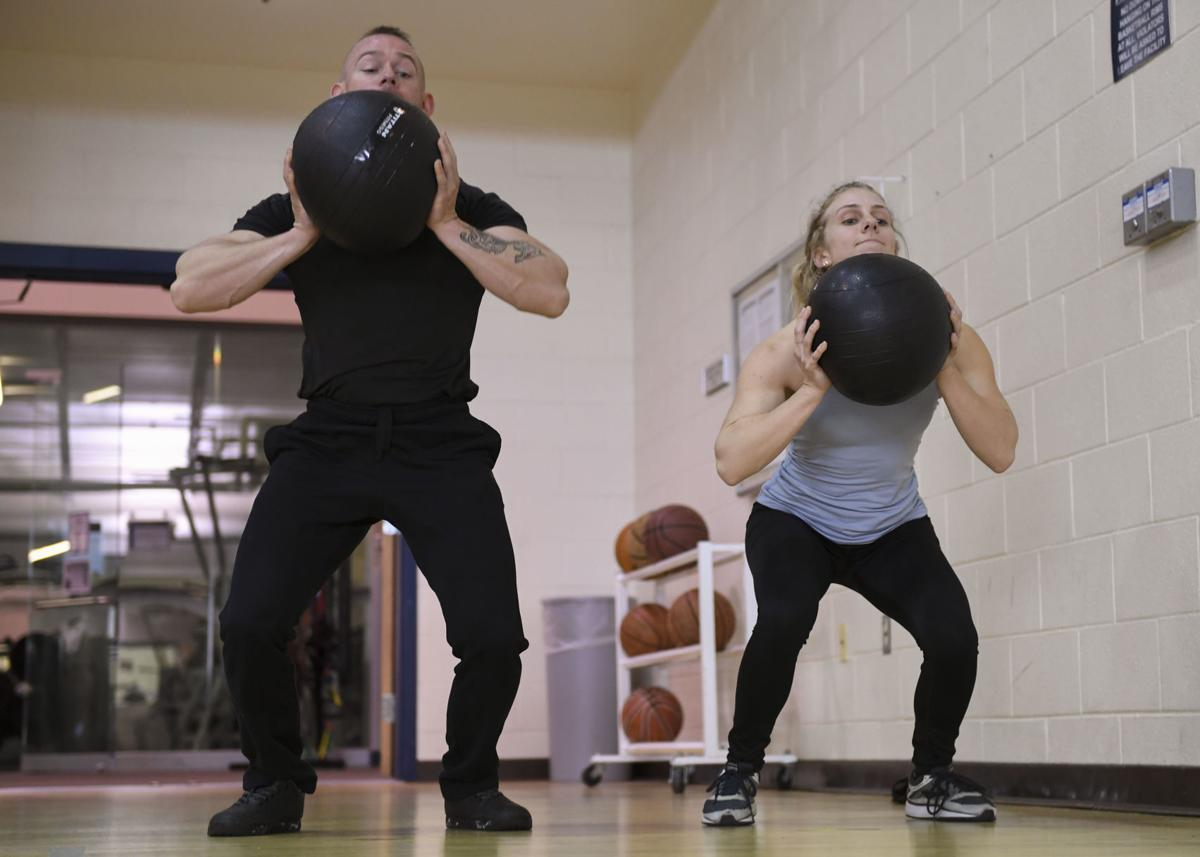
Ballistic training consisting of throwing medicine balls. Note the preparatory crouched posture which preloads the legs and core. This helps to increase the power of the throw.

Ballistic training, also known as compensatory acceleration training, uses exercises which accelerate a force through the entire range of motion. It is a form of power training which can involve throwing weights, jumping with weights, or swinging weights in order to increase explosive power. The intention in ballistic exercises is to maximise the acceleration phase of an object's movement and minimise the deceleration phase. For instance, throwing a medicine ball maximises the acceleration of the ball. This can be contrasted with a standard weight training exercise where there would be a pronounced deceleration phase at the end of the repetition i.e. at the end of a bench press exercise the barbell is decelerated and brought to a halt. Similarly, an athlete jumping whilst holding a trap bar maximises the acceleration of the weight through the process of holding it whilst they jump- where as they would decelerate it at the end of a standard trap bar deadlift.

== History ==
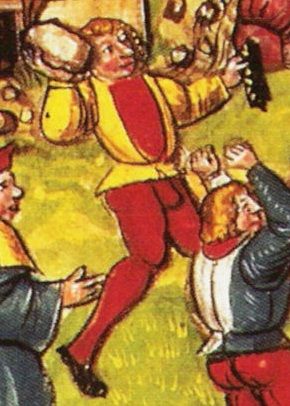
Depiction of a stone put training method from the Swiss Lucerne Chronicle, 1513. Note the preloading of the back leg.

The word ballistic comes from the Greek word βάλλειν (ballein), which means “to throw”. Evidence of ballistic training can be seen throughout recorded history, especially in depictions which show the throwing of a large stone (stone put). Other ballistic disciplines from antiquity include the javelin throw and the discus throw. The hammer throw is a younger discipline, known from the 16th century.

Such throws have been both a popular sporting pastime, and a training method employed by soldiers. Ballistic training was first used in the modern day by elite athletes when they were looking to enhance their ability to perform explosively. Commonly used modern ballistic training exercises are medicine ball throws, bench throws, jump squats, and kettlebell swings.

== Focus and effects ==
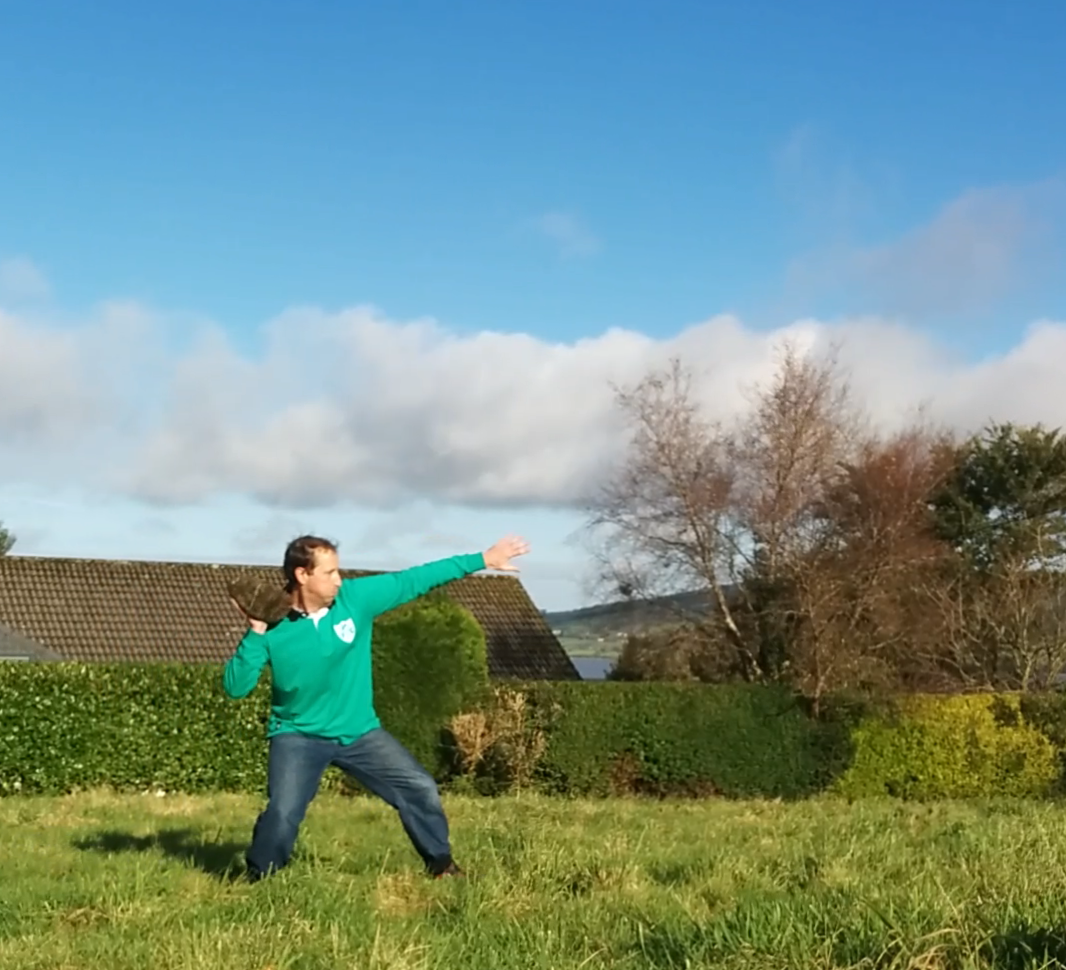
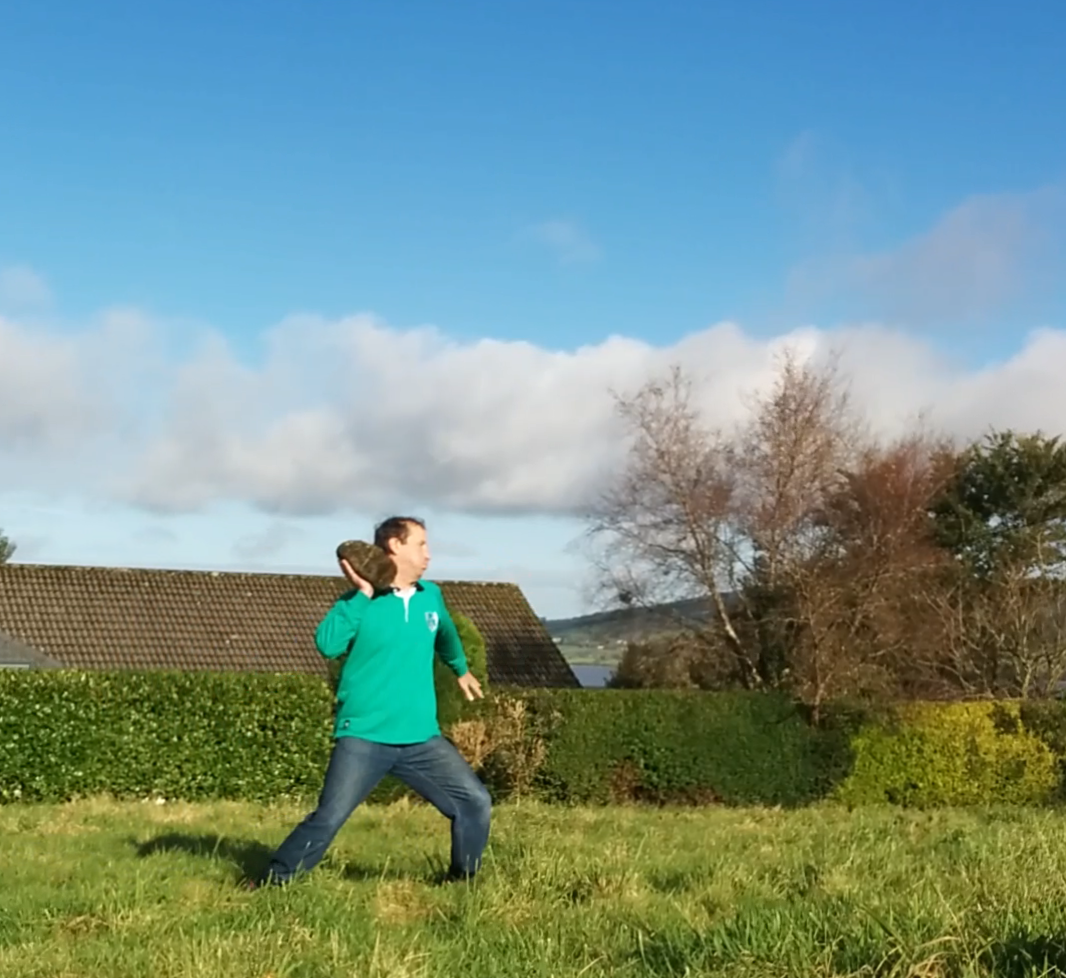
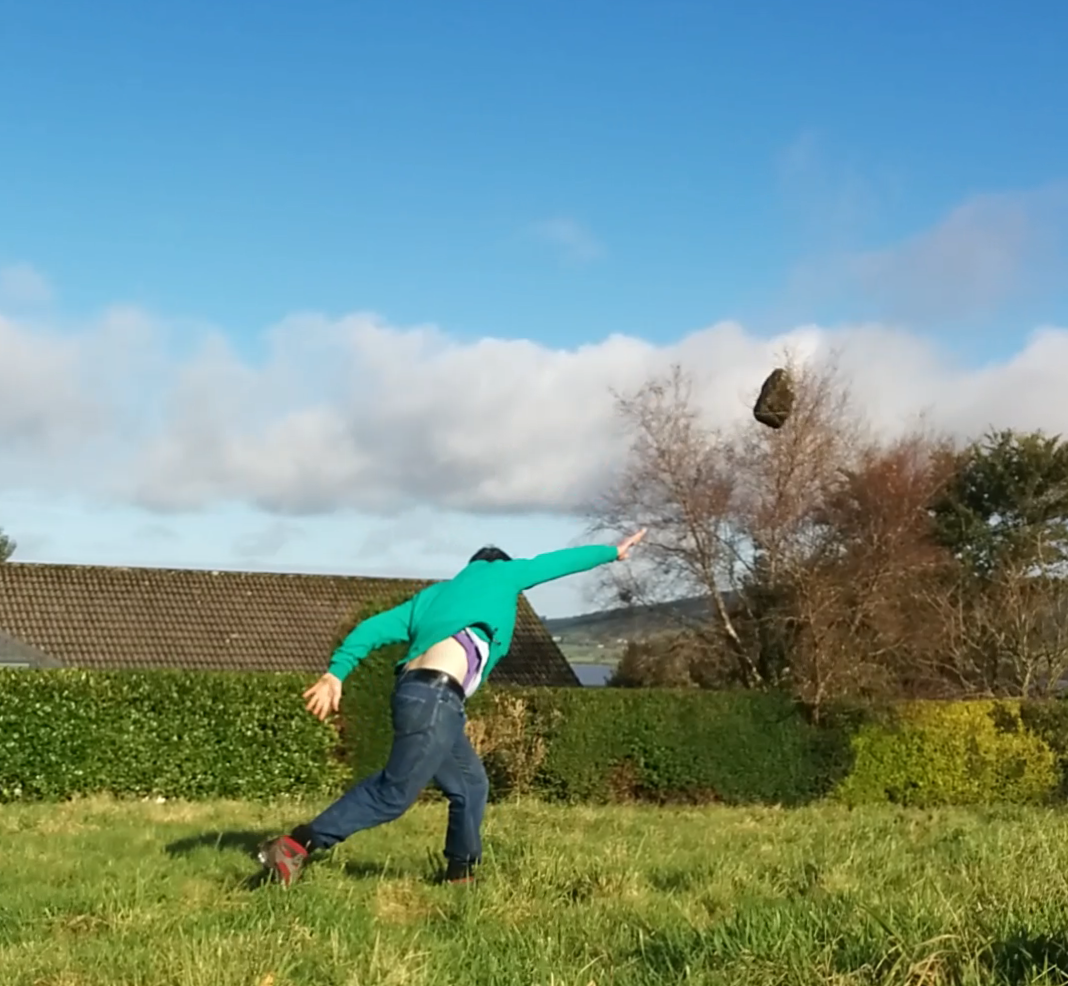
Throwing a large stone is a traditional form of ballistic training, with records of it dating from Ancient Greece. Because the stone is released into the air, there is no need to slow it to a halt like in a standard weight training exercise. Modern ballistic training theory maintains that due to this the body can be conditioned to accelerate more against resistance, with less of an emphasis on deceleration, and thus become more explosive.

Ballistic training requires the muscles to adapt to contracting very quickly and forcefully. This training requires the central nervous system and muscular system to coordinate and produce the greatest amount of force in the shortest time possible i.e. to increase the rate of force development (RFD).

Ballistic training exercises involve dramatically increasing the acceleration phase of the weight's movement and reducing the deceleration phase. For example, in a medicine ball throw the weight is accelerated throughout the exercise in order to propel it into the air. In a weighted jump, the weight continues to be held and so continues to be accelerated throughout the concentric phase of the jumping action. This can be contrasted with standard weight training exercises where the weight is decelerated and brought to a halt at the end of the repetition. For example, in a bench press the barbell is decelerated to a halt at the end of a standard repetition, but in a bench press throw it continues to be accelerated as it is thrown into the air. An exercise performed in a ballistic manner allows for the weight to be moved more forcefully.

== Criteria ==
1. Muscle recruitment principles. Ballistic lifts force the muscles to produce the greatest amount of force in the shortest amount of time. In accordance with Henneman's size principle muscle fibers are recruited from a low to a high threshold as force requirements increase.

2. Speed of the movement. To ensure full muscle fiber recruitment the speed of the lift must be propulsive through the entire range of the movement up until release.

3. Intensity of the exercise. The duration of the lift should be measured by repetitions or time. The lift should be stopped when the bar decelerates. Research has shown the 6-8 repetitions or 20–30 seconds produces the best results.

4. Cardiovascular benefits. Ballistic exercises performed continuously for a minimum of 20 seconds followed by a 30-second rest period and then repeated until deceleration occurs has been proven to elevate the heart rate to training zone level.

5. Co-ordination. Research at the University of Connecticut found that high-intensity training has profound effects on the nervous system. The exercise had to be of an intensity that elevate the heart rate to 90% of maximum rate and had to sustain that rate for at least 20 seconds.

6. Electronic measurement. There are several electronic measurement systems that measure the velocity, power, and effectiveness of a lift. The athlete should stop the lift when the speed of a lift has fallen to 90% of their previous lift. The 90% number signals that there has been a significant change in the recruitment of the fast-twitch muscle fibers. Below the 90% number the lift is no longer ballistic

7. Specificity of training. Ballistic training emphasizes throwing and jumping with a weighted object. Research has resulted in positive increases in vertical jump, throwing velocity, and running speed. There is limited transfer to a specific sport.

== Use in metabolic conditioning ==
Ballistic exercises have traditionally been left out of metabolic conditioning workouts and training programs. This may be due to the fact that they are often technical lifts, or lifts/exercises for which technique is crucial to safe and effective completion. However, with the extensive availability of information and guidance in learning and developing proficiency in ballistic exercise, this trend is changing.

Many training programs which employ circuit training or metabolic conditioning now include ballistic exercises such as kettlebell cleans and snatches, Olympic lifts and variations, throws and plyometric variations. The benefits of their inclusion in these types of programs include higher levels of motor unit recruitment, higher caloric burn and improvements in a number of measurable athletic outputs.

== See also ==
- Calisthenics
- Complex training
- Plyometrics
- Power training
- Strength training
- Velocity Based Training (VBT)
