= Specific physical preparedness =

Specific Physical Preparedness (abbreviated SPP), also referred to by Sports-specific Physical Preparedness is the status of being prepared for the movements in a specific activity (usually a sport).

Specific training includes movements specific to a sport that can only be learned through repetition of those movements. For instance, shooting a free throw, running a marathon, and performing a handstand all require dedicated work on those skills. An SPP phase generally follows a phase of General Physical Preparedness, or GPP, which lays out an athletic base from which to build.

Related movements that mimic certain aspects of the movement which can be specialized in and put together to form it are also part of specific training.
