= Rate of force development =

Amount of force a person can generate per time

Rate of force development (RFD) relates to the amount of force that a person can generate over a period of time. More force generated over a time period means that the RFD is higher. Maximum RFD is based upon the greatest amount of force developed in the shortest time.

== Importance ==
A high RFD is important in order to achieve faster and more powerful movements. For example, an ability to achieve a higher RFD will mean a person can jump higher than they would be able to do otherwise. The interaction between the neuromuscular system and the muscles is of particular importance in understanding the related physiological processes.
