= Calisthenics =

Form of strength training exercises

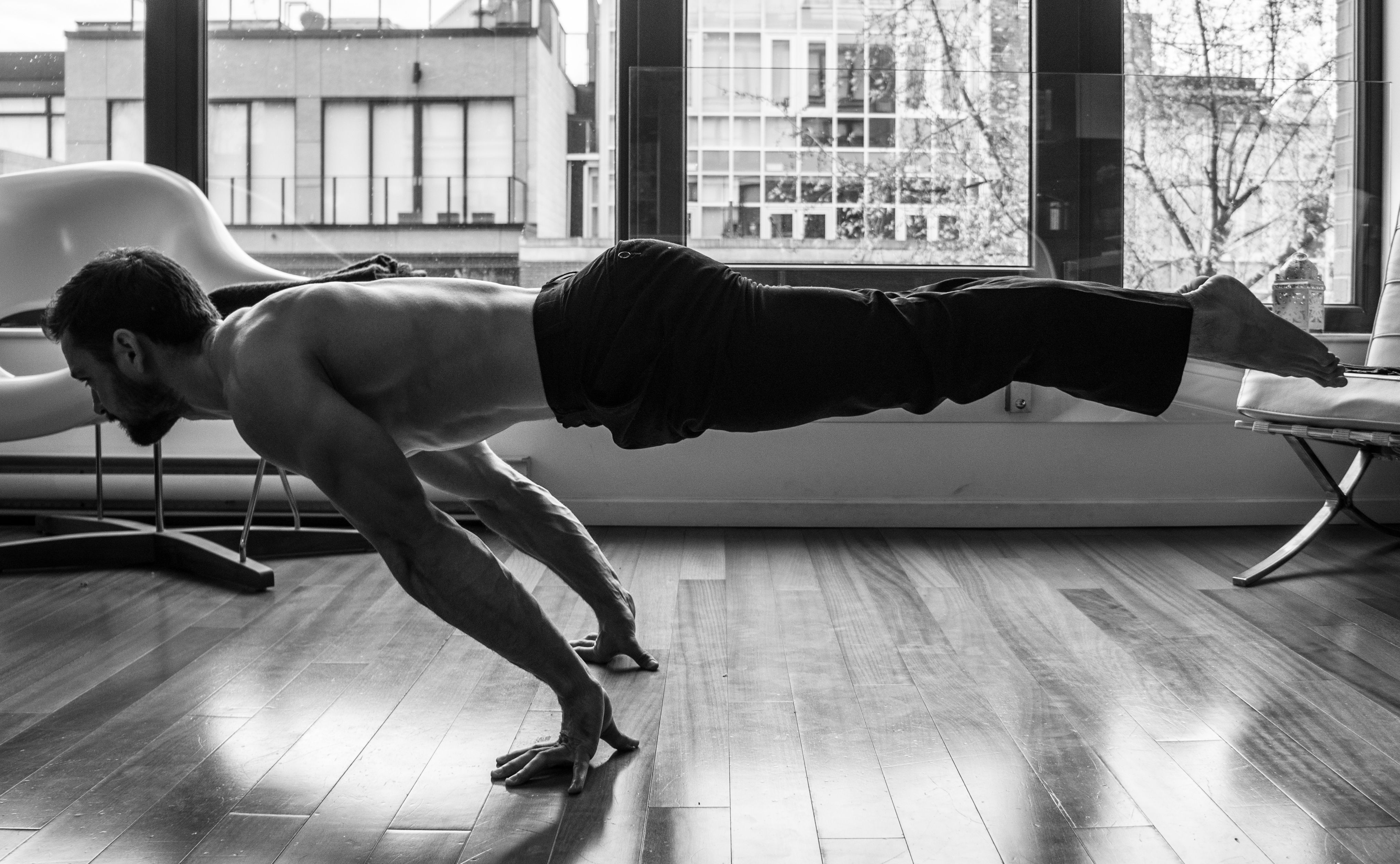
Planche is an advanced calisthenics skill

Calisthenics (American English) or callisthenics (British English) (/ˌkælɪsˈθɛnɪks/, also known as bodyweight exercises) is a form of strength training that utilizes an individual's body weight as resistance to perform multi-joint, compound movements with little or no equipment. Calisthenics are popular for their convenience, as they require little to no equipment and can be performed anywhere.

Calisthenics can enhance a range of biomotor abilities including strength, power, endurance, speed, flexibility, coordination and balance. Such strength training has become more popular among recreational and professional athletes. Calisthenics use simple abilities like pushing, pulling, squatting, bending, twisting and balancing. Movements such as the push-up, the pull-up, and the sit-up are among the most common calisthenic exercises.

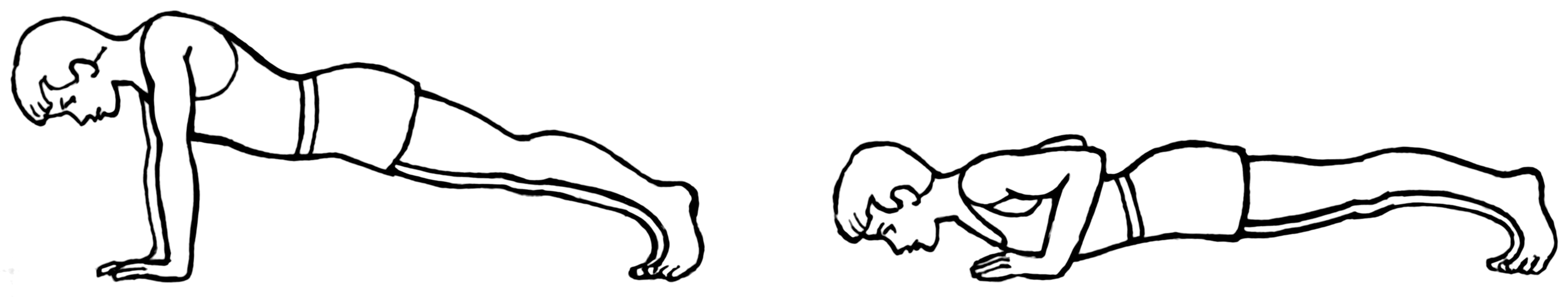
The push-up, a widely known exercise, is arguably one of the best starting points to calisthenics.

== Origin and etymology ==
The Oxford English Dictionary describes calisthenics as "gymnastic exercises to achieve fitness and grace of movement". The word calisthenics comes from the ancient Greek words κάλος (kállos), which means "beauty", and σθένος (sthenos), meaning "strength".

The practice was recorded as being used in ancient Greece, including by the armies of Alexander the Great and the Spartans at the Battle of Thermopylae.

Calisthenics was also recorded to have been used in ancient China. Along with dietary practices, Han dynasty physicians prescribed calisthenics as one of the methods for maintaining one's health.

== Common exercises ==
The more commonly performed calisthenic exercises include:

- Push-ups

Performed face down on the floor, palms against the floor under the shoulders, toes curled upwards against the floor. The arms are used to lift the body while maintaining a straight line from head to heel. The arms go from fully extended in the high position to nearly fully flexed in the low position while avoiding resting on the floor. This exercise trains the chest, shoulders, and triceps. An easier version of this exercise consists of placing the hands on a wall and then bending and straightening the arms.

- Sit-ups

A person lies on their back with their legs bent. They bend at the waist and move their head and torso towards their legs. They then lower themselves back down to the start position. For people who find it difficult to get down onto the ground, a similar range of motion can be achieved by standing with the legs slightly bent, and then bowing slightly and straightening up again.

- Curl-ups

The curl-up or crunch is an abdominal exercise that works the rectus abdominis muscle.

A squat exercise requires little space and no equipment.

- Squats

Standing with the feet a shoulder-width apart, the subject squats down until their thighs are parallel with the floor; during this action, they move their arms forwards in front of them. They then return to a standing position whilst moving their arms back to their sides. Squats train the quadriceps, hamstrings, calves, gluteal muscles, and core. The height of the squat can be adjusted to be deeper or shallower depending on the fitness level of the individual (i.e. half or quarter squats rather than full squats). Since squats can be performed easily in most environments and with a limited amount of space, they are among the most versatile calisthenic exercises. Due to their movement range, squats are regarded as among the most effective exercises to improve strength and endurance.

- Burpees

A full body calisthenics workout that works abdominal muscles, chest, arms, legs, and several parts of the back. The subject squats down and quickly moves their arms and legs into a push-up position. Sometimes, people do a push up (not mandatory) before they finish their rep by tucking the legs in and jumping up.

Pull-ups are a common calisthenic exercise.

- Chin-ups and pull-ups

Chin-ups and pull-ups are similar exercises but use opposite facing grips.
For a chin-up, the palms of the hands are facing the person as they pull up their body using the chin-up bar. The chin-up involves the biceps muscles more than the pull-up but the lats are still the primary mover.
For a pull-up, the bar is grasped using a shoulder-width grip. The subject lifts their body up, chin level with the bar, keeping their back straight throughout the exercise. The bar remains in front of the subject at all times. The subject then slowly returns to starting position in a slow, controlled manner. This primarily trains the lats, and secondary muscles working are upper back muscles, as well as the forearms and core muscles.

- Dips

Done between parallel bars, gymnastic rings or facing either direction of trapezoid bars found in some gyms. Feet are crossed, with either foot in front and the body is lowered until the elbows are in line with the shoulders. The subject then pushes up until the arms are fully extended, but without locking the elbows. Dips focus primarily on the chest, triceps, and deltoids, especially the anterior portion.

- Front lever and back lever

A front lever is performed by executing a lateral pulldown of the bar with straight arms until the body is parallel to the ground, with the front of the body facing upwards. This exercise may be done on rings or a pull-up bar.

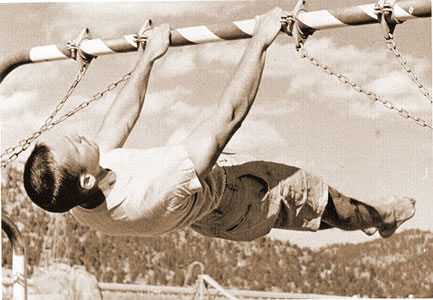
A picture of the front lever hold.

A back lever is performed by lowering from an inverted hang from rings or bar, until the gymnast's body is parallel to the ground and facing towards the floor.

- Handstand

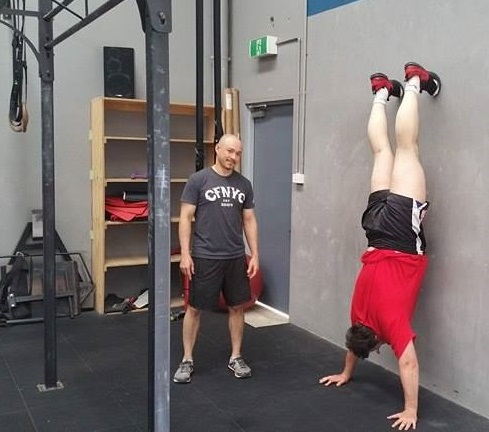
Practicing the wall walk, an exercise for achieving handstands

A handstand is the act of supporting the body in a stable, inverted vertical position by balancing on the hands. In a basic handstand, the body is held straight with arms and legs fully extended, with hands spaced approximately a shoulder-width apart.

- Hyperextensions

Performed in a prone position on the ground, the individual raises the legs, arms and upper body off the ground.

- Leg raises

Lying on the back, hands in fists under buttocks, move feet up and down.

- L-sit

The L-sit is an acrobatic body position in which all body weight rests on the hands, with the torso held in a slightly forward-leaning orientation, with legs held horizontally so that each leg forms a nominal right-angle with the torso. The right-angle causes the body to have a notable "L" shape, hence the name "L-sit". The L sit requires one to keep their core tensed and holding their legs horizontal, so that their body sits in a perfect 'L' position. This requires significant abdominal strength and a high level of hamstring flexibility.

- Muscle-ups

An intermediate to advanced calisthenics exercise. Performed by a combination routine of a pull-up followed by a dip- in one continuous movement. May be done on pull-up bars or rings.

- Planche

One of the most advanced exercises, which may be achieved after years of training. It is performed by protracting and depressing the scapula balancing the body on two arms. The planche requires a high amount of strength (particularly for taller individuals) as well as balance.

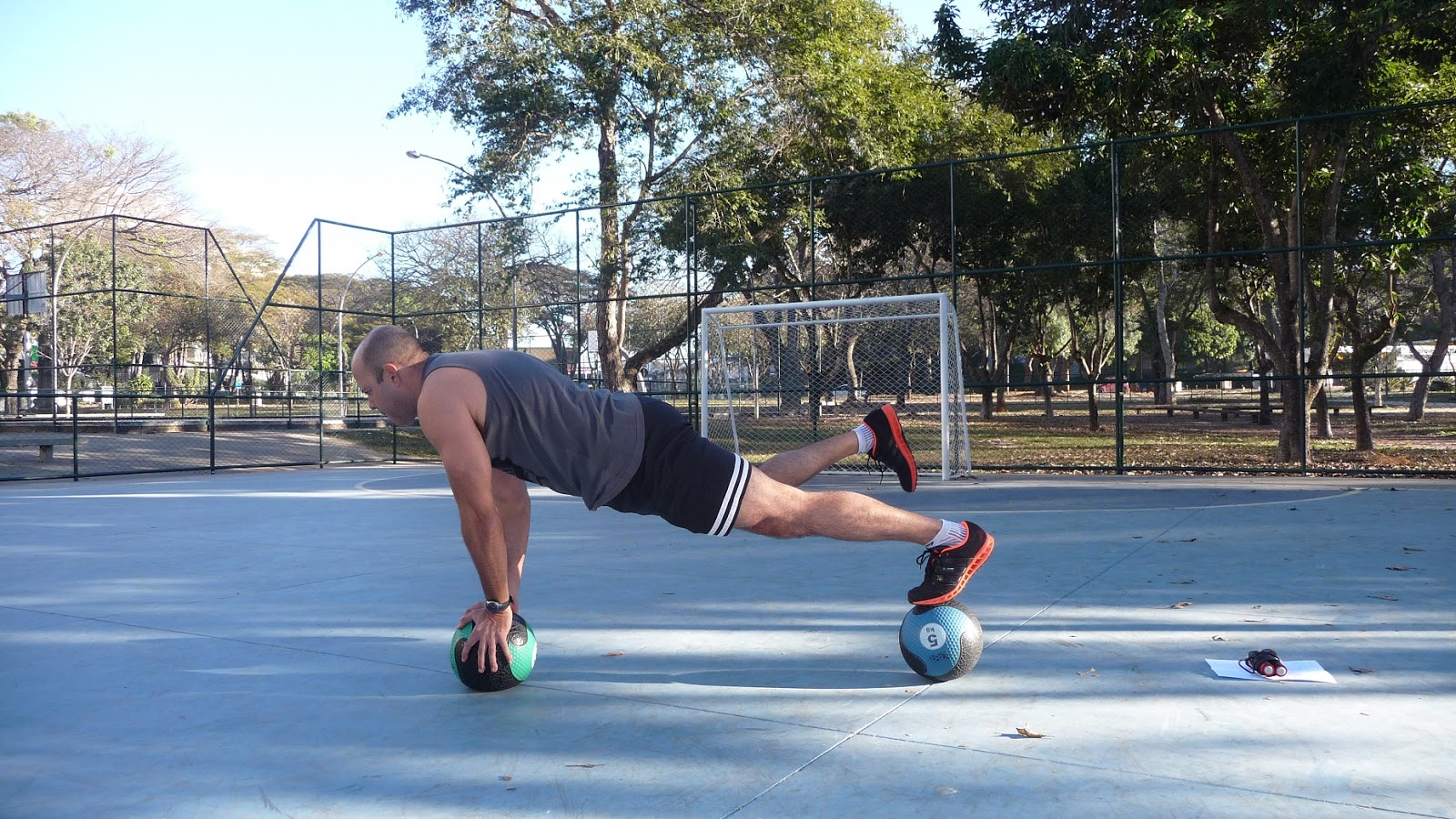
Plank on medicine balls

- Planks

This is the name for holding the 'top' position of a push-up for extended periods of time. The primary muscle involved in this exercise is the rectus abdominis, especially if a posterior pelvic tilt is maintained.

- Calf raises
- Lunges
- Jumping jack

The side-straddle hop is a two-action exercise. From a standing position, the subject first jumps slightly into the air while moving the legs more than a shoulder-width apart, swinging the arms overhead, and clapping the palms together. Secondly, the subject jumps slightly into the air once again while swinging the arms down and to the side, finally returning to a standing position. Both actions must be alternated per repetition.

== Training methods ==
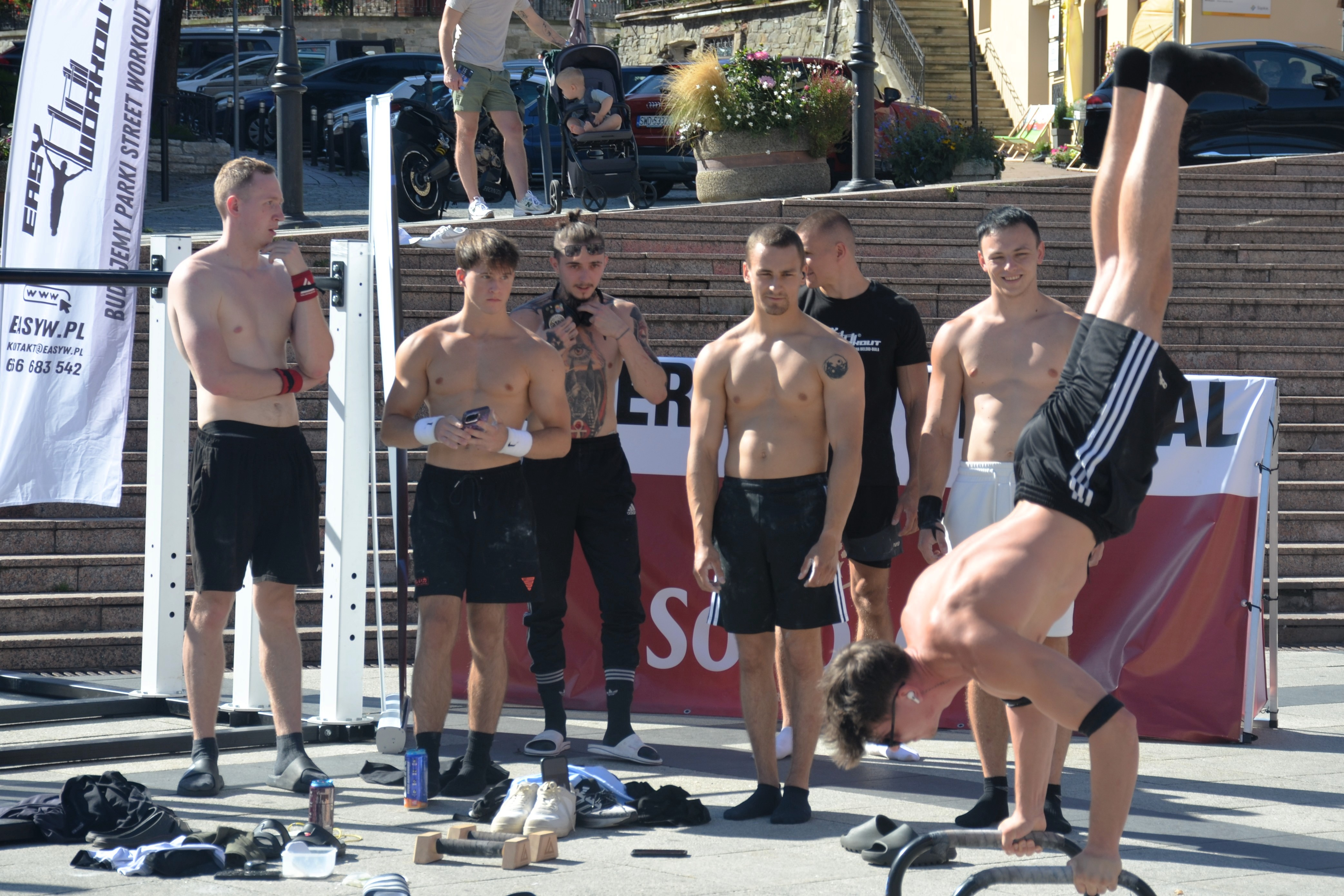
Street workout in Bielsko-Biała

Calisthenics can be used as a means to pursue a number of fitness goals including, but not limited to hypertrophy (increasing one's muscle mass), strength, and endurance.

The training methods employed are often different, depending on the goal. For instance, when pursuing hypertrophy, one aims to increase the load volume over time; when pursuing strength, the intensity of the exercise is increased over time; and to improve endurance, one can gradually shorten their rest periods. In resistance training, training volume is an important factor in hypertrophy, but different muscle groups respond differently to specific volumes

Calisthenics can be used to increase bone density, increasing core control, reducing stiffness but not just limited to it.

Warming up is standard practice before exercises to increase workout performance and reduce injury risk.

=== Progression ===
Progression in calisthenics often includes gradually increasing exercise difficulty which works under the principle of progressive overload. Many exercise variations are available to increase or decrease exercise difficulty to accommodate individual skill and strength levels. Progression may involve changing rep ranges, sets, or body positions. Progression is dependent on training goals and current abilities.

=== Recovery ===
Recovery is an essential part of progression in calisthenics and in any physical discipline. Short term recovery involves immediate recovery which a person consciously and rapidly performs during a repetition or cycle of repetitions, and inter-set recovery which they perform between sets of exercises. For example, immediate recovery could involve quickly recovering after completing a bodyweight squat and before beginning the next one. These short term forms of recovery allow for the quick regaining of energy so that the person can continue to exercise energetically and reduce the chances of fatigue. Longer term recovery is also very important if a person is to progress with their calisthenic ability which includes being able to apply strength effectively in exercises with particular ranges of movement. According to fitness writer, Ashley Kalym, the body ‘becomes stronger in the intervals between training sessions, and for this to happen, it must be allowed a chance to recover.’ Such strengthening of the body in the longer term, and in the interests of developing calisthenic ability, is enhanced via several different recovery methods. These include:

High quality sleep: An appropriate amount, usually considered to be around eight hours, of high quality sleep is recommended for progression to take place. A person should take into account sleep hygiene and adjust their preparation for sleep in order to optimise its restorative effects. For example, having a break from electronic screens for at least 20 minutes before going to sleep.

A nutritious diet: A nutritious, varied diet with a balance of protein, carbohydrate and fat is recommended. Increased protein consumption is important in order to aid muscle growth and repair. The overall amount of food eaten is typically increased in parallel with increased training demands i.e. more dairy may be eaten in order to boost protein and fat intake when a more difficult workout is introduced.

A person’s increased ability to recover in the longer term means that they are better able to recover in the short term while practicing calisthenics because they are more rested and have higher energy levels for it. For a similar reason, their chances of injury are reduced because they are less likely to suffer from fatigue. Calisthenic practitioners must take into account the possibility of tendon and ligament strain as many of the exercises involve high levels of muscular tension for extended periods of time i.e. performing sets of chin ups places strain on the tendons in the arms. Recovering the required amount significantly reduces such risks and improves performance.

=== Calisthenics Equipment ===
Although calisthenics is primarily focused on bodyweight for resistance, equipment can be used to increase exercise difficulty or range of motion.

- Parallettes: A small pair of low to the ground, identical bars which simulate parallel bars used in gymnastics.

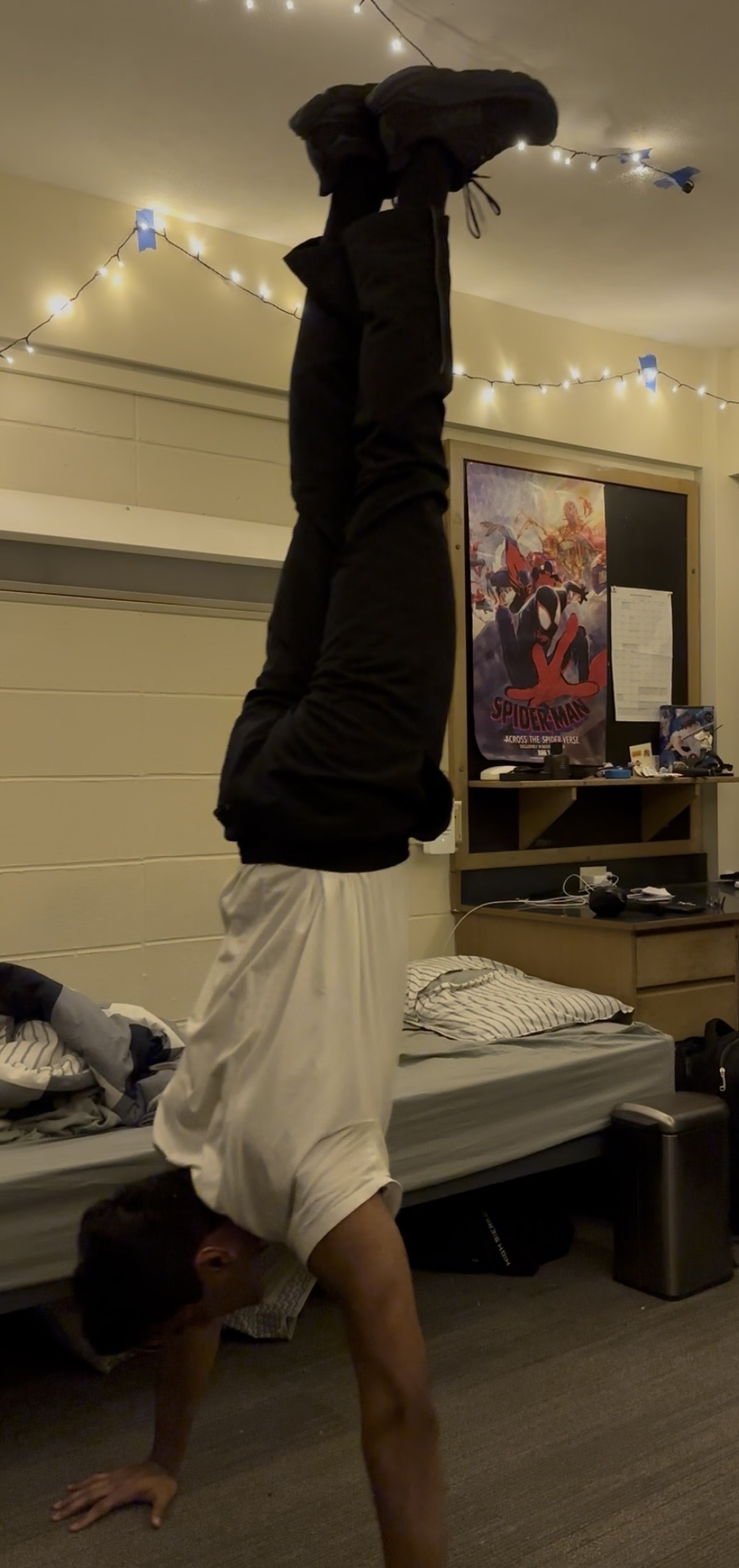
Man performing handstand hold.

== Statics ==
Statics are a form of calisthenics mainly involving advanced isometric exercises, and some dynamic variations of the isometric exercises in question. Examples of statics are:

- Front lever
- Back lever
- Planche
- Human flag
- Handstand

Many of these skills can be performed with the hands at different widths, and rotated in different directions, affecting the difficulty of the exercises.

== Co-operative calisthenics ==
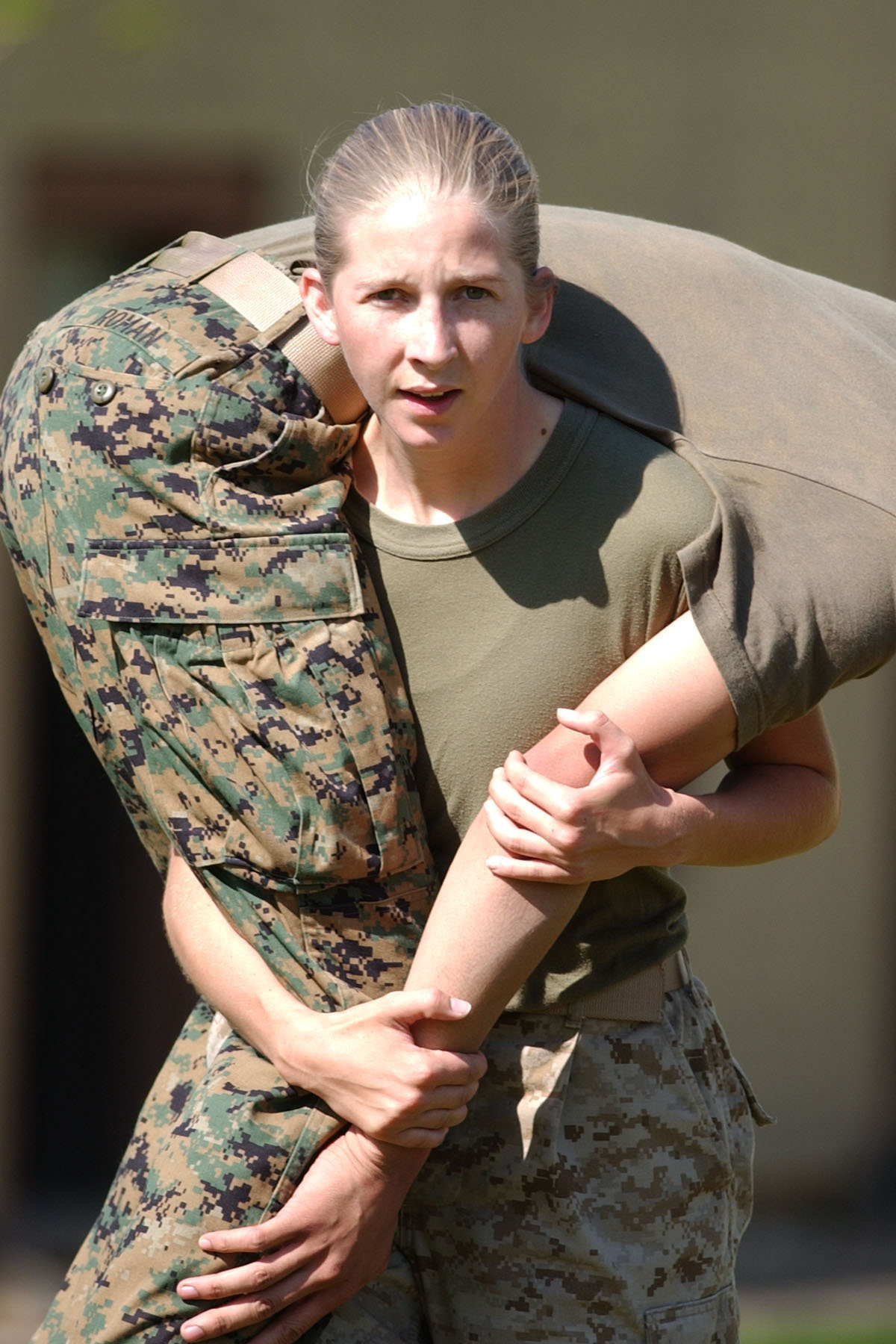
The fireman's carry is a simple co-operative calisthenic exercise which can be used to improve general strength and fitness. Such exercises can also be used to prepare for situations where carrying someone might be required to rescue them, as demonstrated by these US Marines.

Co-operative calisthenics refers to calisthenic exercises that involve two or more participants helping each other to perform the exercise. Such exercises may also be known as partner exercises, partner-resisted exercises, partner carrying, or bodyweight exercises with a partner. They have been used for centuries as a way of building physical strength, endurance, mobility, and co-ordination. Usually, one person performs the exercise and the other person adds resistance. For example, a person performing squats with someone on their back, or someone holding another person in their arms and walking around. Some exercises also involve the use of equipment. Two people may hold onto different ends of a rope and pull in different directions. One person would deliberately provide a lesser amount of resistance, which adds resistance to the exercise whilst also allowing the other person to move through a full range of motion as their superior level of force application pulls the rope along. A disadvantage of these exercises is that it can be challenging to measure how much resistance is being added by the partner, when considered in comparison to free weights or machines. An advantage such exercise has is that it allows for relatively high levels of resistance to be added with equipment being optional. On this basis, co-operative calisthenics can be just as easily performed on a playing field as in a gym. They are also versatile enough to allow them to be used for training goals other than simple strength. For example, a squat with a partner can be turned into a power-focused exercise by jumping or hopping with the partner instead, or even lifting them up on one knee.

== Advantages and benefits ==
While some exercises may require equipment, most calisthenic exercises require none. For exercises requiring equipment, common household items (such as a bath towel for towel curls) are often sufficient, or substitutes may be improvised (for example, using a horizontal tree branch to perform pull-ups). As such, calisthenics are convenient while traveling or on vacation, when access to a gym or specialized equipment may not be available. Another advantage of bodyweight training is that it entails no cost.

A 2017 study, "The effects of a calisthenics training intervention on posture, strength and body composition", found that calisthenics training is an "effective training solution to improve posture, strength and body composition without the use of any major training equipment". A 2015 study found that calisthenics significantly improved flexibility in elderly adults over a year of training. Another study done on a group of sedentary participants found that minimal implementation of calisthenics throughout the day can lessen the impact that aging has on neuromuscular function. Calisthenics, like other forms of resistance training, can reduce risks for all forms of cardiovascular diseases.

Older people doing calisthenics benefit through gains in muscle mass, in mobility, in bone density, as well as in reduced depression and improved sleep habits. It is also believed that calisthenics may help diminish or even prevent cognitive decline as people age. In addition, the higher risk of falls seen in elderly people may be mitigated by calisthenics. Exercises focusing on the legs and abdomen such as squats, lunges, and step ups are recommended to increase leg and core strength, in doing so, reduce the risk of falling. Calisthenics provide multi-directional movement that mimics daily activities, and as such can be preferable to using weight machines.

== History ==
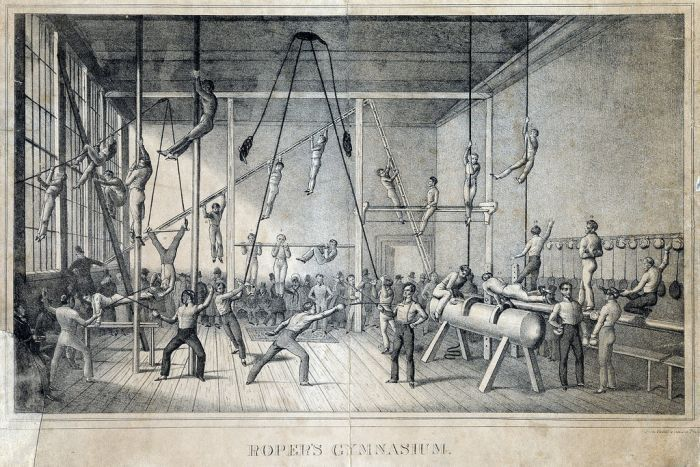
Roper's Gymnasium, Philadelphia, c. 1831. Climbing, balancing and gymnastics have been popular forms of calisthenic exercise throughout history and are still practiced in the modern day.

Catharine Esther Beecher (1800–1878) was an American educator and author who popularized and shaped a conservative ideological movement to both elevate and entrench women's place in the domestic sphere of American culture. She introduced calisthenics in a course of physical education and promoted it.

Disciples of Friedrich Ludwig Jahn brought their version of gymnastics to the United States, while Beecher and Dio Lewis set up physical education programs for women in the 19th century. Organized systems of calisthenics in America took a back seat to competitive sports after the Battle of the Systems, when the states mandated physical education systems.

Australia's calisthenics movement grew popular in the mid-nineteenth century, especially for girls and women. A mixture of dance, performance, music and community-building movements, calisthenics in Australia continues today.

The Royal Canadian Air Force's calisthenics program published in the 1960s helped to launch modern fitness culture.

Calisthenics is associated with the rapidly growing international sport called street workout. The street workout consists of athletes performing calisthenics routines in timed sessions, in front of a panel of judges. The World Street Workout & Calisthenics Federation (WSWCF), based in Riga, Latvia, orchestrates the annual national championships and hosts the world championships for the sport. The World Calisthenics Organization (WCO), based in Los Angeles, California, promotes a series of competitions known globally as "the Battle of the Bars". The WCO created the first set of rules for formal competitions, including weight classes, a timed round system, original judging criteria and a 10-point must system, giving an increasing number of athletes worldwide an opportunity to compete in these global competitions.

Street workout competitions have also popularized 'freestyle calisthenics', which is a style of calisthenics where the athlete uses their power and momentum to perform dynamic skills and tricks on the bar, often as part of a routine where each trick is linked together in a consistent flow. Freestyle calisthenics requires great skill to control one's momentum and an understanding of the mechanics of the body and the bar.

== Calisthenics parks ==
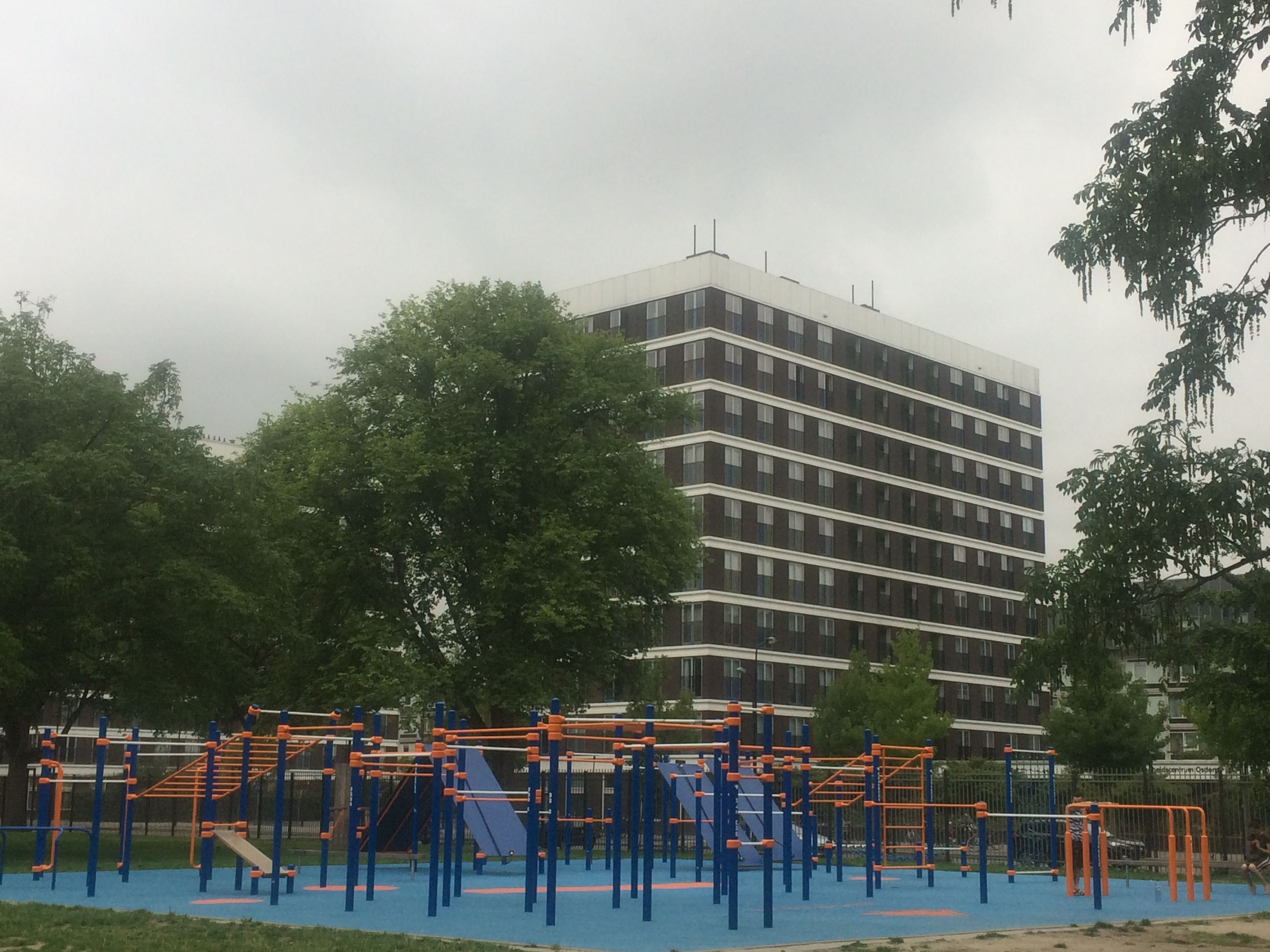
Park in Osdorp, Amsterdam, NLD where one can practice calisthenics

Some outdoor fitness training areas and outdoor gyms are designed especially for calisthenics training, and most are free to use by the public. Calisthenics parks equipment include pull-up bars, monkey bars, parallel bars, and box jumps. Freely accessible online maps exist that show the locations and sample photos of calisthenics parks around the world.

== See also ==
- Alexander technique
- Ballistic training
- Circuit training
- Complex training
- CrossFit
- Fitness trail
- Gymnastics
- Handstand
- Muscle-up
- Parkour
- Pilates
- Plyometrics
- Power training
- Pull-up (exercise)
- Sport
- Street workout
- Strength training
- Unilateral training
