= Abdominal exercise =

Exercise strengthening the abdominal muscles

Abdominal exercises are strength exercise affecting the abdominal muscles (colloquially known as the stomach muscles or "abs"). The human abdominal muscular set consists of four: the rectus abdominis, internal oblique, external oblique, and transversus abdominis. During the execution of abdominal training, understanding the functions, effects, and variations in exercise, along with considering the suitability, and safety in relation to current physical condition is crucial, as overtraining can lead to severe injury.

== Effects ==
Abdominal exercises are useful for building abdominal muscles. This is useful for improving performance with certain sports, back pain, and for withstanding abdominal impacts (e.g., taking punches). According to a 2011 study, abdominal muscle exercises are known to increase the strength and endurance of the abdominal muscles.

It has been highly disputed whether or not abdominal exercises have any reducing effect on abdominal fat. The aforementioned 2011 study found that abdominal exercise does not reduce abdominal fat; to achieve that, a deficit in energy expenditure and caloric intake must be created—abdominal exercises alone are not enough to reduce abdominal fat and the girth of the abdomen. Early results from a 2006 study found that walking exercise (not abdominal exercise specifically) reduced the size of subcutaneous abdominal fat cells; cell size predicts type 2 diabetes according to a lead author. Moderate exercise reduced cell size by about 18% in 45 obese women over 20 weeks; diet alone did not appear to affect cell size.

== Functions of abdominal muscles ==
Abdominal muscles have many important functions, including breathing, coughing, and sneezing, and maintaining posture and speech in a number of species. Other abdominal functions are that it helps "in the function of support, containment of viscera, and help in the process of expiration, defecation, urination, vomiting, and also at the time of childbirth." The anterior abdominal wall is made up of four muscles—the rectus abdominis muscle, the internal and external obliques, and the transversus abdominis."The two internal muscles, the internal oblique, and the transverse abdominis, respond more to increases in chemical or volume-related drive than the two external muscles, the rectus abdominis and external oblique; the basis for this differential sensitivity is unknown".

== Core training ==
Not only can a one-sided preference for abdominal muscles (lack of exercise focused on other core muscles) result in creating muscle imbalances, but the effectiveness of exercise is also far from what could be achieved with a balanced workout planning. Core training frequently utilizes balance exercises, such as training of transverse abdomens and multifidus, training of diaphragm, and training of pelvic floor muscles. Core strength exercises that are performed are to help influence core stability.

The goal of core training is definitely not to develop muscle hypertrophy but to improve functional predispositions of physical activity. This particularly involves improving intermuscular coordination or synchronization of participating muscles.

The involvement of the core means more than just compressing abdominal muscles when in crouching or seated position. The role of the core muscles is to stabilize the spine. Resisting expansion or rotation is as important as the ability to execute the movement.

== Abdominal exercises ==
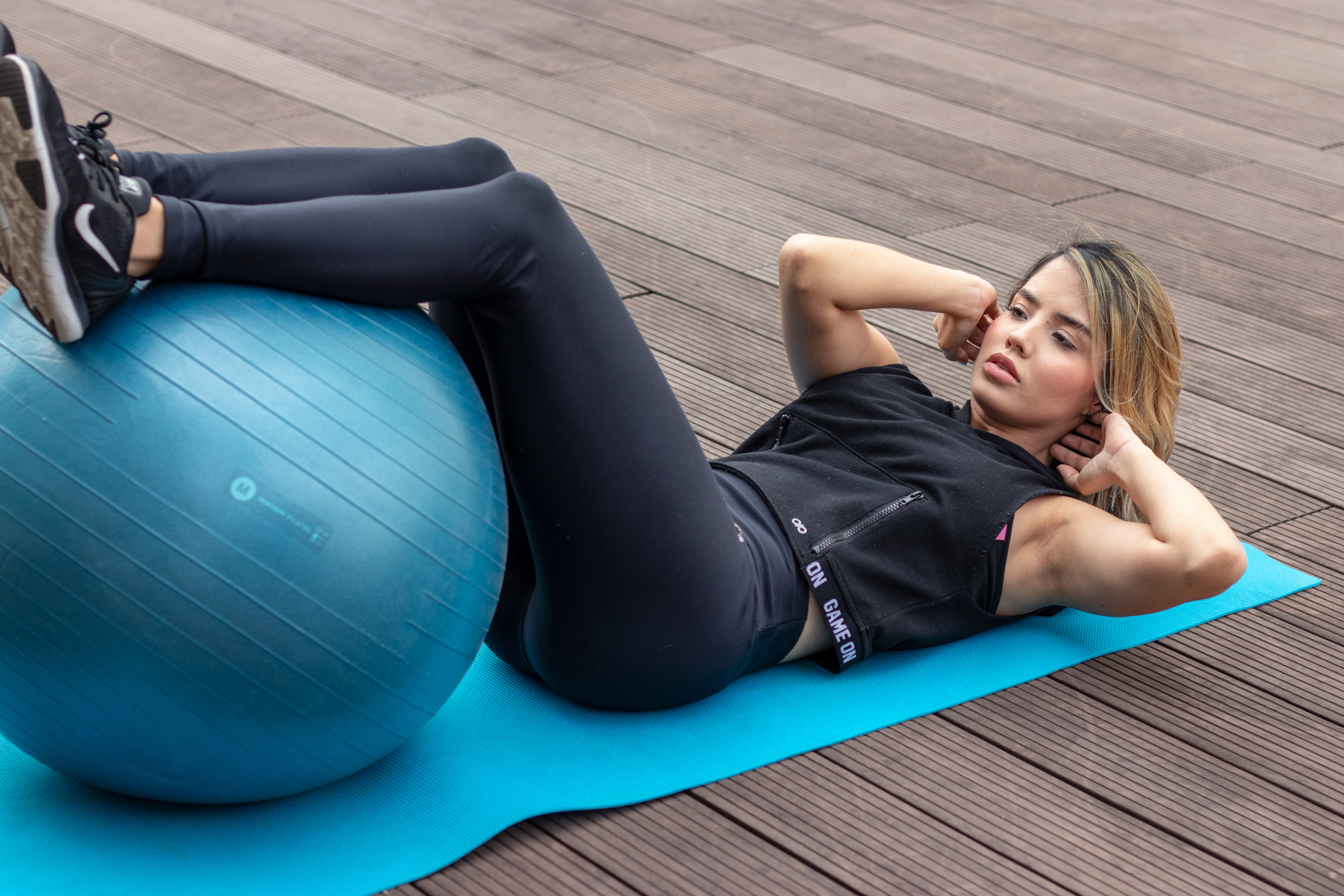
This image shows an abdominal exercise crunch using a stability ball.

There is a variety of no-equipment, and weighted core exercises available online. Setting a routine, or simply choosing one over the others (or accompanying the others) is a bit more elaborate than finding instructions, though --- since each exercise involves a specific sort of muscle, researching the mechanism of action is recommended for optimal effect.

The abdominal crunch, for example, is a very well-known exercise, made notorious by the popular belief that its usage leads to the build of visible "six-pack abs". A variant of it includes lying with feet laid flat on the ground, and raising one's body, which activates the all abdominal muscle sorts, and flexes the spine. Crossing one's arms over their chest may ease the exercise or reduce discomfort.

Experts caution that overuse of crunch-based exercises can lead to injuries and less optimal function by placing undue stress on the lower back. Alternative exercises, such as dead-bugs and planks, are often recommended, as they focus on spine stability, instead of repeated spinal movement.

The abdominal plank strengthens the trunk and the obliques. This exercise requires one to lie facedown with their legs straight and their elbows bent at 90 degrees before rising. The weight must be supported on the forearms and toes while the position is held.

Moving forward, another exercise people can begin doing is to lie on their back and putting their feet at a 45° angle while moving their legs as if they were riding a bicycle. In addition, people can lie down with their hands on their side of their body and position a book on their stomach while raising their stomach up and down to feel the burn in their core. People may also lie down and position their feet at a 45° angle and lift them straight and bend them back down to the 45° angle then repeat. Once people have completed those they can stand straight with both of their arms opened and straight and bend down to the left then to the right by using one hand at a time. While standing people can also stand straight and position their hands on their hips and rotate their bodies from right to left and vice versa while bending forward and backward. Another way someone can work on their abdominals is by sitting on top of their legs in a bed while bending their chest forward until it touches the bed then coming back up to their normal position. Also, people can sit down on a bed with their legs straight and they will lie back and come back up without using their hands. While using a chair they can place their arms on the side of a chair and with their legs backward they will push down until their abdominal touches the chair. Finally, people can lie down with their feet straight and raise their legs to a right angle and then back down. For a better visual understanding, all these exercises were obtained from an Abdominal Exercise Journal.

=== Momentaneous activity ===
One way to estimate the effectiveness of any abdominal exercise is in measuring the momentaneous activity by electromyography (EMG), with the activity generally being compared to that of the traditional crunch. However, an exercise of lower activity performed during a long time can give at least as much exercise as a high-activity exercise, with the main difference being that a prolonged duration results in more in aerobic exercise than strength training.

The following tables rank abdominal exercises from highest to lowest in terms of activity as determined by the EMG measures:

Activity in rectus abdominis
exercise	mean activity^{1}
Bicycle crunch	248%
Captain's chair	212%
Exercise ball	139%
Vertical leg crunch	129%
Torso track	127%
Long arm crunch	119%
Reverse crunch	109%
Crunch with heel push	107%
Ab roller	105%
Hover	100%
Traditional crunch	100%
Exercise tubing pull	92%
Ab rocker	21%

Activity in obliques
exercise	mean activity^{1}
Captain's chair	310%
Bicycle crunch	290%
Reverse crunch	240%
Hover	230%
Vertical leg crunch	216%
Exercise ball	147%
Torso track	145%
Crunch with heel push	126%
Long arm crunch	126%
Ab roller	101%
Traditional crunch	100%
Exercise tubing pull	77%
Ab rocker	74%

^{1}Compared to traditional crunch (100%)

=== Bicycle crunch ===
The bicycle targets the rectus abdominals and the obliques. Also, the rectus abdominals can be worked out with the basic crunch, the vertical crunch, the reverse crunch, and the full vertical crunch, and when at a low enough body fat percentage (10-12% for males, 15-18% for females) the individual parts of the muscle become visible; many refer to this visible separation as a six-pack. By exercising the internal and external obliques the stomach can be flattened. The long arm crunch, in which arms are straightened behind, adds a longer lever to the move and emphasizes the upper part of the abs. The plank exercise not only strengthens the abs but also the back and stabilizes the muscles.

=== Gadgets ===
Abdominal exercises can also be performed with the help of some machines and the captain's chair is one of the most popular machines used in gyms and health clubs. Other machines are the Ab Roller, the Ab Rocket Twister, the Chin-up bar in conjunction with Ab Straps, and the Torso Track. An exercise ball is also a tool that helps strengthen the abs. It may be more effective than the crunches on the floor because the abs do more work as the legs are not involved in the exercise. With respect to the Ab-Slide, the study performed by Bird et al. showed greater muscle activation in the upper rectus abdominis, lower rectus abdominis, and external oblique when compared to the standard abdominal crunch. The Ab-Slide has proven to be an effective tool in strengthening the abdominal muscles from a concentric muscle action perspective. However, this research does not support replacing the traditional crunch exercise with the Ab-Slide gadget due to the lack of proven effectiveness in the eccentric loading of the abdominal muscles and the greater postural control. Potentially the most effective equipment for abdominal strengthening is those that offer the least stability. Examples include the CoreFitnessRoller, bodyweight suspension training such as TRX, and stability balls with or without the Halo.

== Safety of abdominal exercises ==
Abdominal exercises also put some degree of compressive force on the lumbar spine, putting unwanted stress on the lower back. In addition, exaggerated abdominal exercise can cause respiratory problems. A study of twelve exercises concluded that no single exercise covered all abdominal muscles with high intensity and low compression.

- High challenge-to-compression ratio
  - Crunch with feet anchored
  - Crunch with feet free
  - Bicycle crunch
  - Hanging straight leg raise
- High challenge, higher compression
  - Straight-leg sit-up
  - Bent-leg sit-up
- Low compression, lower challenge
  - Crunch with feet anchored
  - Crunch with feet free
- Low challenge-to-compression ratio
  (not recommended!)
  - Supine straight-leg raise
  - Supine bent-leg raise
  - Hanging bent-leg raise
  - Static cross-knee crunch

The benefit of focused training on the "deep core" muscles such as the transversus abdominis has been disputed, with some experts advocating a more comprehensive training regimen.

== See also ==
- Abdominizer
- Abdominal obesity
- Pull-up (exercise)
- Core (anatomy)
- Crunches
- Pilates
- Roman chair
- Sit-ups
- Spot reduction
