= Abdomenizer =

Abdominal exerciser

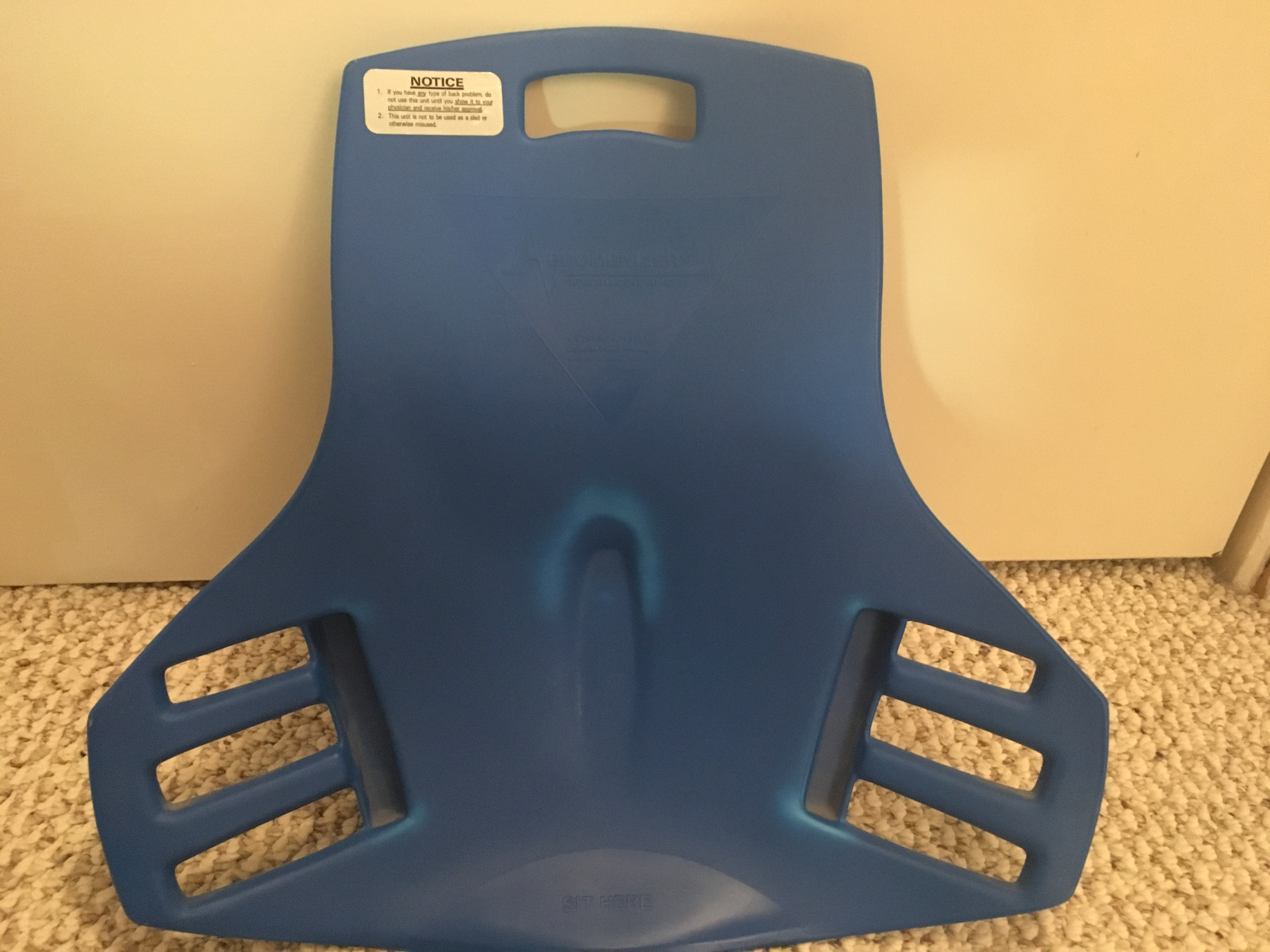
Abdomenizer

The Abdomenizer was an abdominal exerciser invented in 1984 by Canadian chiropractor Dennis Colonello and marketed through infomercials by the Fitness Quest corporation of Canton, Ohio, selling around six million. It was designed to protect the lower back during sit-ups.

== Product ==
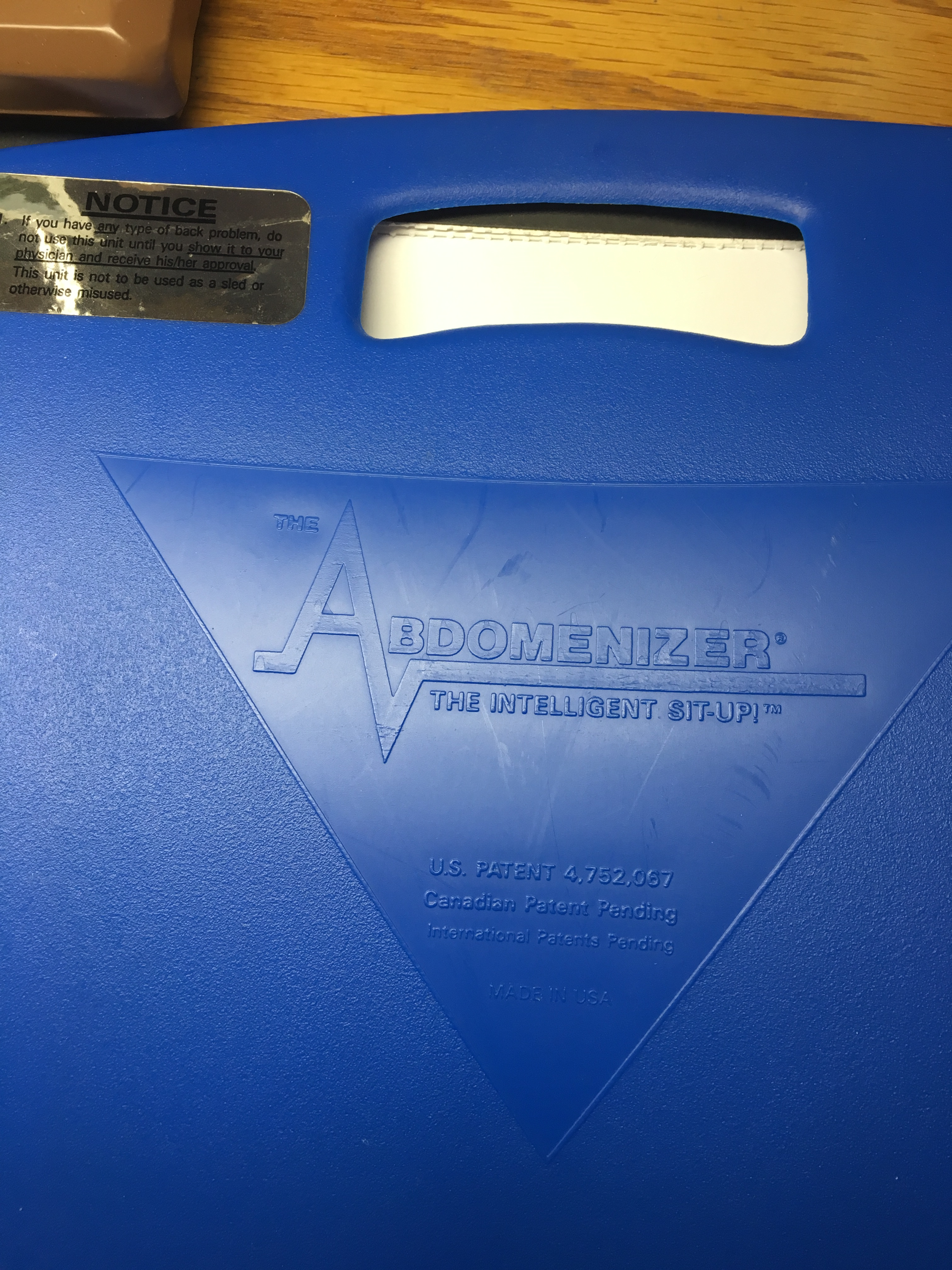
Abdomenizer Closeup

The Abdomenizer is an almost flat, saddle-like piece of thermoformed plastic, about 60 by 90 cm (2 by 3 ft), with handles and a depression for the tailbone. Colonello said in an interview in 2014 that the aim was to help people such as farmers consulting his practice in Ontario to do some exercise to develop core strength. He made one prototype and tested the product in his clinical practice before being approached to market the product.

Many people used them as snow sleds, and a warning label was affixed advising against this use.

== Reception ==
Six million were sold in 57 countries, mainly through direct response television advertising. The Abdomenizer is no longer sold after Fitness Quest acquired the rights and then stopped production when sales dropped.

Expert opinion on the usefulness of the Abdomenizer was mixed. The Los Angeles Times noted that "they won't make the exercise any easier and they won't magically "firm both upper and lower abdominals," as the box claims." The Telegraph suggest that using an Abdomenizer might lead to overly fast movements, causing injury. A physical therapist interviewed by Men's Health suggested that the device would not protect the back, but would reduce effort and so lower the effectiveness of exercise. Wired described it as "A symbol for TV shopping channels everywhere, a cheaply made, overpriced widget that is destined to be unpacked, tried exactly once, and consigned to the basement".

== Advertising ==
Retail sales of the product were not initially successful. The Abdominizer was then advertised in television infomercials, first broadcast in October 1988. They were developed by direct marketer Collette Liantonio and featured actress Charlene Tilton and the New Zealand voice actor John Sweetman. The adverts promised that you would "rock, rock, rock your way to a firmer stomach". By 1992, 1.5 million had been sold at $19.95 directly from TV advertising, and 2 million more had been sold in stores, This was described by Jay Conrad Levinson and Seth Godin as "a classic example of the way that informercials can drive the retail market". Tilton cameoed in the Married... with Children episode "Tis Time to Smell the Roses" as herself, selling the Abdomenizer door-to-door. Colonello described the infomercial as "silly" in 2014.
