= Neuroscience of rhythm =

Forms of rhythm generated by the central nervous system

The neuroscience of rhythm refers to the various forms of rhythm generated by the central nervous system (CNS). Nerve cells, also known as neurons, in the human brain are capable of firing in specific patterns which cause oscillations. The brain possesses many different types of oscillators with different periods. Oscillators are simultaneously outputting frequencies from 0.02 Hz to 600 Hz. It is now well known that a computer is capable of running thousands of processes with just one high-frequency clock. Humans have many different clocks as a result of evolution. Prior organisms had no need for a fast-responding oscillator. This multi-clock system permits quick response to constantly changing sensory input while still maintaining the autonomic processes that sustain life. This method modulates and controls a great deal of bodily functions.

== Autonomic rhythms ==
The autonomic nervous system is responsible for many of the regulatory processes that sustain human life. Autonomic regulation is involuntary, meaning we do not have to think about it for it to take place. A great deal of these are dependent upon a certain rhythm, such as sleep, heart rate, and breathing.

=== Circadian rhythms ===
Circadian literally translates to "about a day" in Latin. This refers to the human 24-hour cycle of sleep and wakefulness. This cycle is driven by light. The human body must photoentrain or synchronize itself with light in order to make this happen. The rod cells are the photoreceptor cells in the retina capable of sensing light. However, they are not what sets the biological clock. The photosensitive retinal ganglion cells contain a pigment called melanopsin. This photopigment is depolarized in the presence of light, unlike the rods which are hyperpolarized. Melanopsin encodes the day-night cycle to the suprachiasmatic nucleus (SCN) via the retinohypothalamic tract. The SCN evokes a response from the spinal cord. Preganglionic neurons in the spinal cord modulate the superior cervical ganglia, which synapses on the pineal gland. The pineal gland synthesizes the neurohormone melatonin from tryptophan. Melatonin is secreted into the bloodstream where it affects neural activity by interacting with melatonin receptors on the SCN. The SCN is then able to influence the sleep wake cycle, acting as the "apex of a hierarchy" that governs physiological timing functions. "Rest and sleep are the best example of self-organized operations within neuronal circuits".

A-riot-of-rhythms-neuronal-and-glial-circadian-oscillators-in-the-mediobasal-hypothalamus-1756-6606-2-28-S3

Sleep and memory have been closely correlated for over a century. It seemed logical that the rehearsal of learned information during the day, such as in dreams, could be responsible for this consolidation. REM sleep was first studied in 1953. It was thought to be the sole contributor to memory due to its association with dreams. It has recently been suggested that if sleep and waking experience are found to be using the same neuronal content, it is reasonable to say that all sleep has a role in memory consolidation. This is supported by the rhythmic behavior of the brain. Harmonic oscillators have the capability to reproduce a perturbation that happened in previous cycles. It follows that when the brain is unperturbed, such as during sleep, it is in essence rehearsing the perturbations of the day. Recent studies have confirmed that off-wave states, such as slow-wave sleep, play a part in consolidation as well as REM sleep. There have even been studies done implying that sleep can lead to insight or creativity. Jan Born, from the University of Lubeck, showed subjects a number series with a hidden rule. He allowed one group to sleep for three hours, while the other group stayed awake. The awake group showed no progress, while most of the group that was allowed to sleep was able to solve the rule. This is just one example of how rhythm could contribute to humans unique cognitive abilities.

=== Central pattern generation ===
A central pattern generator (CPG) is defined as a neural network that does not require sensory input to generate a rhythm. This rhythm can be used to regulate essential physiological processes. These networks are often found in the spinal cord. It has been hypothesized that certain CPG's are hardwired from birth. For example, an infant does not have to learn how to breathe and yet it is a complicated action that involves a coordinated rhythm from the medulla. The first CPG was discovered by removing neurons from a locust. It was observed that the group of neurons was still firing as if the locust was in flight. In 1994, evidence of CPG's in humans was found. A former quadrapalegic began to have some very limited movement in his lower legs. Upon lying down, he noticed that if he moved his hips just right his legs began making walking motions. The rhythmic motor patterns were enough to give the man painful muscle fatigue.

A key part of CPG's is half-center oscillators. In its simplest form, this refers to two neurons capable of rhythmogenesis when firing together. The generation of a biological rhythm, or rhythmogenesis, is done by a series of inhibition and activation. For example, a first neuron inhibits a second one while it fires, however, it also induces slow depolarization in the second neuron. This is followed by the release of an action potential from the second neuron as a result of depolarization, which acts on the first in a similar fashion. This allows for self-sustaining patterns of oscillation. Furthermore, new motor patterns, such as athletic skills or the ability to play an instrument, also use half-center oscillators and are simply learned perturbations to CPG's already in place.

=== Respiration ===
Ventilation requires periodic movements of the respiratory muscles. These muscles are controlled by a rhythm generating network in the brain stem. These neurons comprise the ventral respiratory group (VRG). Although this process is not fully understood, it is believed to be governed by a CPG and there have been several models proposed. The classic three phase model of respiration was proposed by D.W. Richter. It contains 2 stages of breathing, inspiratory and expiratory, that are controlled by three neural phases, inspiration, post-inspiration and expiration. Specific neural networks are dedicated to each phase. They are capable of maintaining a sustained level of oxygen in the blood by triggering the lungs to expand and contract at the correct time. This was seen by the measuring of action potentials. It was observed that certain groups of neurons synchronized with certain phases of respiration. The overall behavior was oscillatory in nature. This is an example of how an autonomous biorhythm can control a crucial bodily function.

== Cognition ==
This refers to the types of rhythm that humans are able to generate, be it from recognition of others or sheer creativity.

=== Sports ===
Muscle coordination, muscle memory, and innate game awareness all rely on the nervous system to produce a specific firing pattern in response to an either an efferent or afferent signal. Sports are governed by the same production and perception of oscillations that govern much of human activity. For example, in basketball, in order to anticipate the game one must recognize rhythmic patterns of other players and perform actions calibrated to these movements. "The rhythm of a game of basketball emerges from the rhythm of individuals, the rhythm among team members, and the rhythmic contrasts between opposing teams". Although the exact oscillatory pattern that modulates different sports has not been found, there have been studies done to show a correlation between athletic performance and circadian timing. It has been shown certain times of the day are better for training and gametime performance. Training has the best results when done in the morning, while it is better to play a game at night.

=== Music ===
The ability to perceive and generate music is frequently studied as a way to further understand human rhythmic processing. Research projects, such as Brain Beats, are currently studying this by developing beat tracking algorithms and designing experimental protocols to analyze human rhythmic processing. This is rhythm in its most obvious form. Human beings have an innate ability to listen to a rhythm and track the beat, as seen here "Dueling Banjos". This can be done by bobbing the head, tapping of the feet or even clapping. Jessica Grahn and Matthew Brett call this spontaneous movement "motor prediction". They hypothesized that it is caused by the basal ganglia and the supplementary motor area (SMA). This would mean that those areas of the brain would be responsible for spontaneous rhythm generation, although further research is required to prove this. However, they did prove that the basal ganglia and SMA are highly involved in rhythm perception. In a study where patients brain activity was recorded using fMRI, increased activity was seen in these areas both in patients moving spontaneously (bobbing their head) and in those who were told to stay still.

== Computational models ==
Computational neuroscience is the theoretical study of the brain used to uncover the principles and mechanisms that guide the development, organization, information-processing and mental abilities of the nervous system. Many computational models have attempted to quantify the process of how various rhythms are created by humans.

=== Avian song learning ===
Juvenile avian song learning is one of the animal models used to study generation and recognition of rhythm. The ability for birds to process a tutor song and then generate a perfect replica of that song, underlies our ability to learn rhythm.

Two very famous computational neuroscientists Kenji Doya and Terrence J. Sejnowski created a model of this using the Zebra Finch as target organism. The Zebra Finch is perhaps one of the most easily understood examples of this among birds. The young Zebra Finch is exposed to a "tutor song" from the adult, during a critical period. This is defined as the time of life that learning can take place, in other words when the brain has the most plasticity. After this period, the bird is able to produce an adult song, which is said to be crystallized at this point. Doya and Sejnowski evaluated three possible ways that this leaning could happen, an immediate, one shot perfection of the tutor song, error learning, and reinforcement learning. They settled on the third scheme. Reinforcement learning consists of a "critic" in the brain capable of evaluating the difference between the tutor and the template song. Assuming the two are closer than the last trial, this "critic" then sends a signal activating NMDA receptors on the articulator of the song. In the case of the Zebra Finch, this articulator is the robust nucleus of archistriatum or RA. The NMDA receptors allow the RA to be more likely to produce this template of the tutor song, thus leading to learning of the correct song.

Dr. Sam Sober explains the process of tutor song recognition and generation using error learning. This refers to a signal generated by the avian brain that corresponds to the error between the tutor song and the auditory feedback the bird gets. The signal is simply optimized in order to be as small of a difference as possible, which results in the learning of the song. Dr. Sober believes that this is also the mechanism employed in human speech learning. Although it's clear that humans are constantly adjusting their speech while birds are believed to have crystallized their song upon reaching adulthood. He tested this idea by using headphones to alter a Bengalese finch's auditory feedback. The bird actually corrected for up to 40% of the perturbation. This provides strong support for error learning in humans.

=== Macaque motor cortex ===
This animal model has been said to be more similar to humans than birds. It has been shown that humans demonstrate 15–30 Hz (Beta) oscillations in the cortex while performing muscle coordination exercises. This was also seen in macaque monkey cortices. The cortical local field potentials (LFPs) of conscious monkeys were recorded while they performed a precision grip task. More specifically, the pyramidal tract neurons (PTNs) were targeted for measurement. The primary frequency recorded was between 15 and 30 Hz, the same oscillation found in humans. These findings indicate that the macaque monkey cortex could be a good model for rhythm perception and production. One example of how this model is used is the investigation of the role of motor cortex PTNs in "corticomuscular coherence" (muscle coordination). In similar study where LFPs were recorded from macaque monkeys while they performed a precision grip task, it was seen that the disruption of the PTN resulted in a greatly reduced oscillatory response. Stimulation of the PTN caused the monkeys to not be able to perform the grip task as well. It was concluded that PTNs in the motor cortex directly influence the generation of Beta rhythms.

== Imaging ==
=== Current methods ===
At the moment, recording methods are not capable of simultaneously measuring small and large areas at the same time, with the temporal resolution that the circuitry of the brain requires. These techniques include EEG, MEG, fMRI, optical recordings, and single-cell recordings.

=== Future ===
Techniques such as large scale single-cell recordings are movements in the direction of analyzing overall brain rhythms. However, these require invasive procedures, such as tetrode implantation, which does not allow a healthy brain to be studied. Also, pharmacological manipulation, cell culture imaging and computational biology all make attempts at doing this but in the end they are indirect.

== Frequency bands ==
The classification of frequency borders allowed for a meaningful taxonomy capable of describing brain rhythms, known as neural oscillations.

Class	Range
Delta	.5–4 Hz
Theta	4–8 Hz
Alpha	8–12 Hz
Beta	12–30 Hz
Gamma	>30 Hz
