= Planche (exercise) =

Gymnastics and calisthenics skill

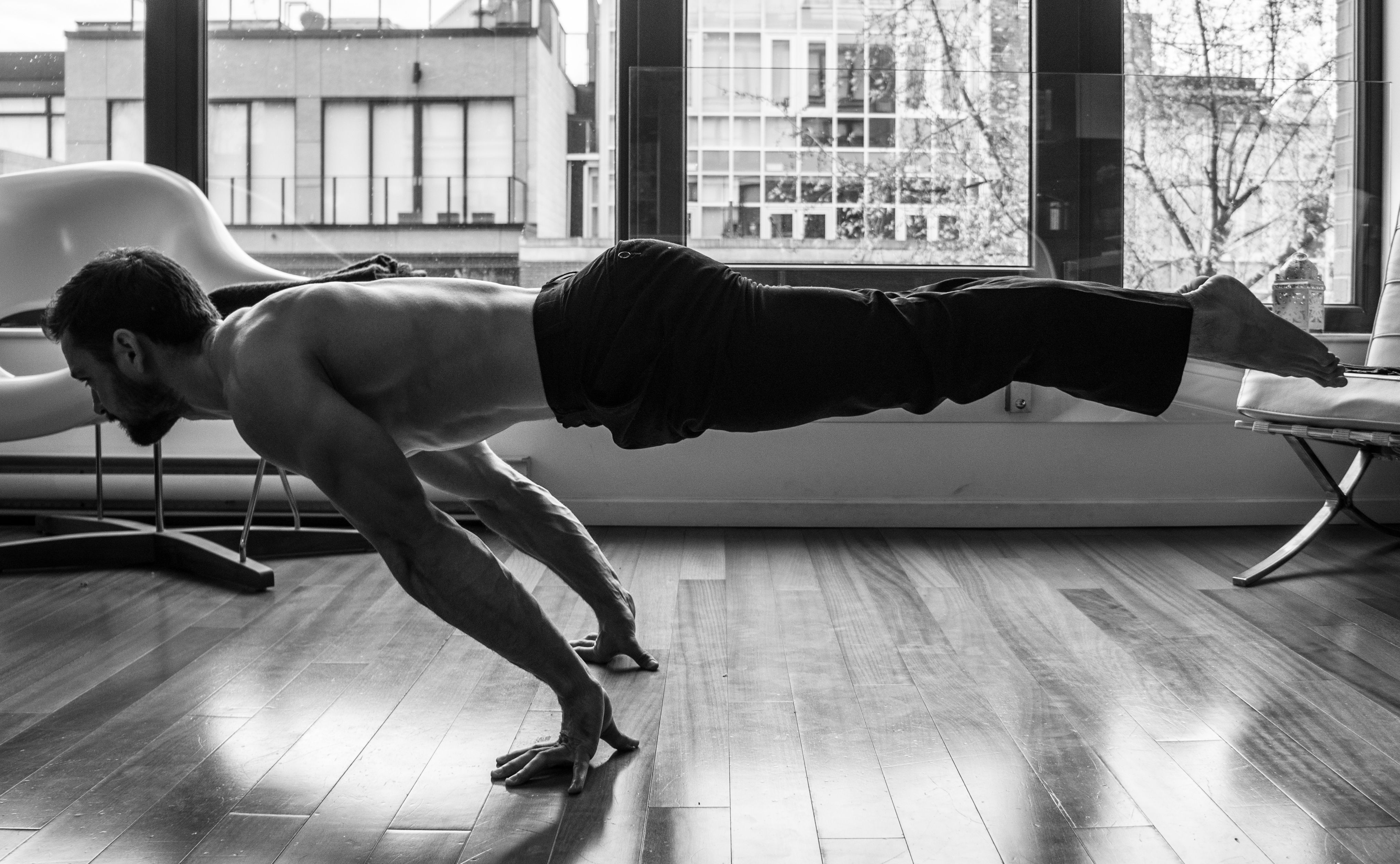
Planche position

A planche (from French planche, meaning "plank") is a skill in gymnastics and calisthenics in which the body is held parallel to the ground, while being supported above the floor by straight arms. It is a move that requires significant strength and balance.

There are many variations of a planche, although only two are accredited in artistic gymnastics: the straddle planche, and the full planche. Depending on the event, it can range from an A to a D skill, and must be held for at least two seconds. As an example, on gymnastic rings, the straddle planche is an A value skill, and the full planche is a C value skill. On floor, straddle/full is A/C. The main muscles used in this exercise are the anterior deltoid and the biceps, but the abdominals, chest, shoulders, lower back, and glutes also play important roles.

As the planche is a demanding position, athletes train for it with a progression of simpler moves, advancing to the next when they have gained mastery of the intermediate positions. A typical training progression usually consists of the frog stand, tuck planche, advanced tuck planche, straddle planche, and then full planche. The planche requires arms to be locked at all times.

== Muscles used ==
The muscles used in planche are:

- Biceps
- Triceps
- Deltoid
- Brachialis
- Biceps femoris
- Gluteus maximus
- Latissimus dorsi
- Pectoralis major
- Serratus anterior
- Soleus
- Supraspinatus
- Trapezius
- Quadriceps
- Wrist flexors
- Anconeus
- Rectus Abdominis

== Possible injuries ==
- Torn ligaments/tendons in the arms (especially the distal biceps tendon)
- Wrist injury
- Shoulder injury
- Elbow injury
- Inflammation of the tendons of the arms
- Injury in back/spine

== Planche world records ==
- Longest planche hold on parallel bars - 47 seconds by Michele Esposito on 17 November 2023
- Most consecutive full planche presses - 17 repetitions by Viktor Kamenov

== See also ==
- Bodyweight exercise
- Mayurasana – peacock pose in yoga as exercise, the body supported on bent arms
- Plank (exercise)
- Gymnastics
- Front Lever
- Back lever
- Human flag
