= Back lever =

Static hold performed on the rings or the pull-up bar

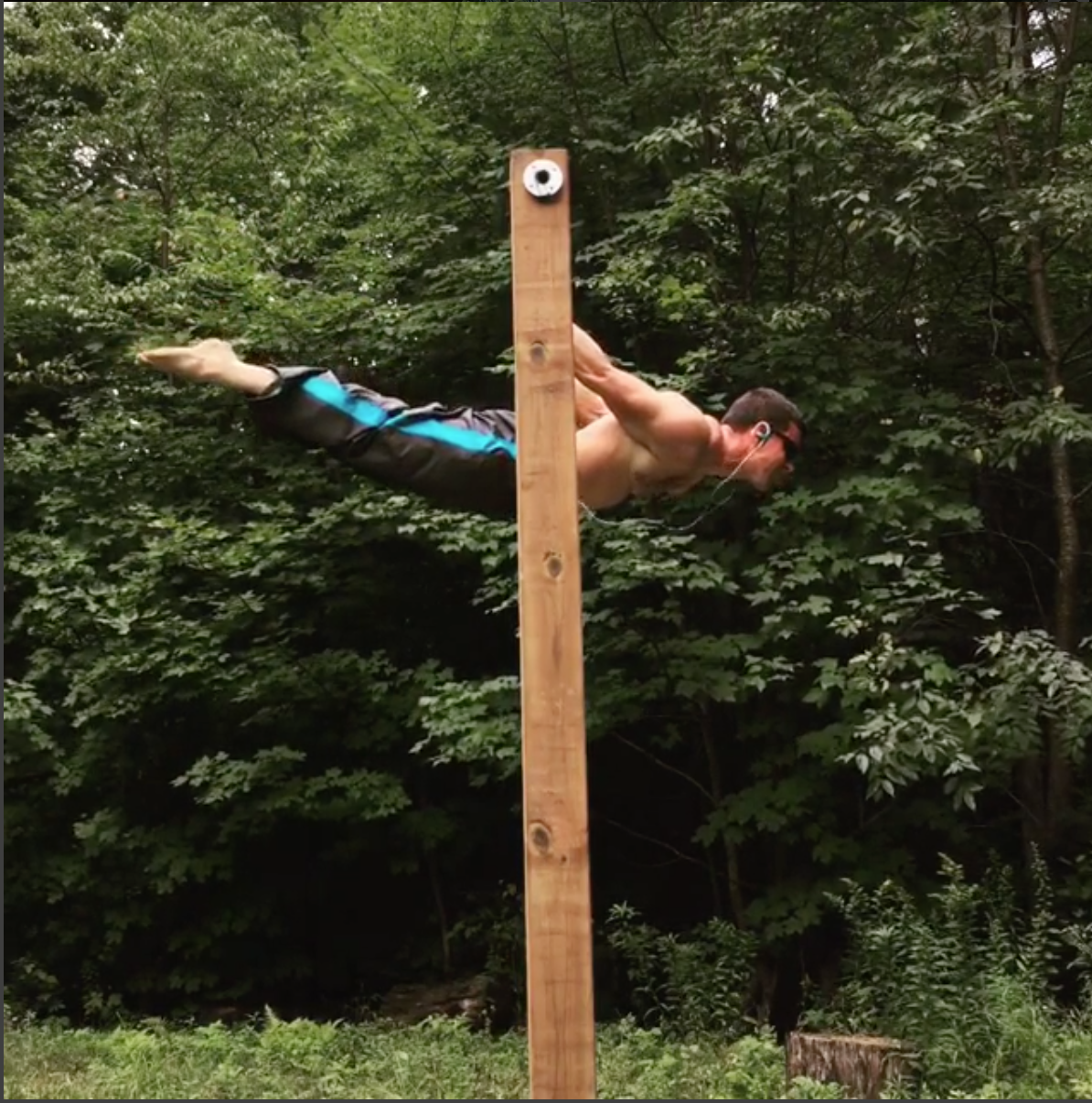
Back lever on a pullup bar

A back lever is a static hold performed on the rings or the pull-up bar. A back lever is rated as an 'A' value skill on the Code of Points, a scale from A to F, with F being the most difficult.

A back lever is performed by lowering from an inverted hang until the gymnast's body is parallel to the ground and facing towards the floor.

Performing a back lever requires a high degree of strength in the back and biceps; a lot of core tension must be generated to stay horizontal.

The world record is held by the Spanish Joan Romero with 73 seconds.

== See also ==
- Front lever
- Planche (exercise)
- Human flag
