= Crunch (exercise) =

Abdominal exercise

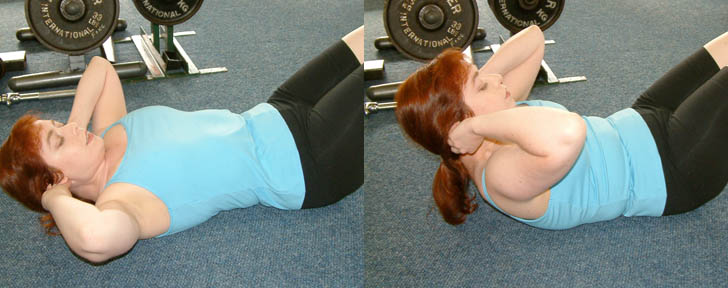
Performing the crunch

The crunch or curl-up is an abdominal exercise that works the rectus abdominis muscle. Crunches use the exerciser's own body weight to strengthen muscle and are recommended by some experts, despite negative research results, as a low-cost exercise that can be performed at home. Crunches are less effective than other exercises such as planks and carry risk of back injury.

== Form ==
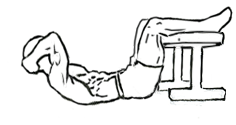
In a crunch, the lower back does not lift off the floor

The biomechanics professor Stuart McGill was quoted in The New York Times Health blog as stating:

An approved crunch begins with you lying down, one knee bent, and hands positioned beneath your lower back for support. "Do not hollow your stomach or press your back against the floor", McGill says. Gently lift your head and shoulders, hold briefly and relax back down.

Research has shown that both sit-ups and crunches are mediocre strength-building exercises and have injured many people.

In a crunch, unlike a sit-up, the lower back stays on the floor. This is said to eliminate any involvement by the hip flexors, and make the crunch an effective isolation exercise for the abdominals.

== World records ==
Sirous Ahmadi has the record of doing over 20,000 crunches in under 5 hours on May 11, 2024.

In 2018, John Peterson from the US did 6,774 crunches in an hour and in 2021, he did a total of 13,994 crunches in two hours.

== See also ==
- Plank (exercise)
- Sit-up
