= Toning exercises =

Exercises purporting to improve body shape

Toning exercises is a popular but unfounded term referring to physical exercises intended to create a more defined and lean-looking physique. The term toned implies leanness, that is low levels of body fat, noticeable muscle definition and shape, but not significant muscle size, or "bulk".

Research and fundamental anatomical knowledge imply that the notion of specific exercises to improve "tone" is unfounded. What exercises can do is aid fat loss or stimulate muscle hypertrophy. The size of the muscle can change, as can the amount of fat covering the muscle, but the "shape" cannot.

Exercises popularly believed to improve tone typically involve weight lifting with high repetitions, low resistance (light weights), and short rest periods. However, this approach is widely criticized as inefficient and ineffective.

Instead, public health bodies advocate for a generally healthy lifestyle that includes regular exercise. A healthy lifestyle includes resistance training to stimulate muscle breakdown and repair, thereby increasing muscle mass and boosting metabolism, as muscle tissue has a higher caloric demand than fat. Additionally, incorporating cardiovascular exercise helps burn energy and promote fat loss. Finally, maintaining a healthy diet is critical to reduce energy intake and ensuring adequate nutrient provision for muscle growth and repair. Achieving low body fat is essential for a visibly defined and lean appearance, as what contributes to a softer look is merely fat coverage.

== See also ==
- Spot reduction, the misconception that fat can be targeted for reduction from a specific area of the body
