= Front lever =

Gymnastic and calisthenic move

The front lever is a calisthenics move that uses your upper back strength to lift your body up into a flat plank. The front lever is a static hold normally performed on the still rings or on a bar. A front lever is performed by lowering from an inverted hang until the body is completely horizontal and straight with the front of the body facing upwards. An accomplished gymnast may also pull directly into the horizontal position from a dead hang. Front levers require a high degree of back and core strength.

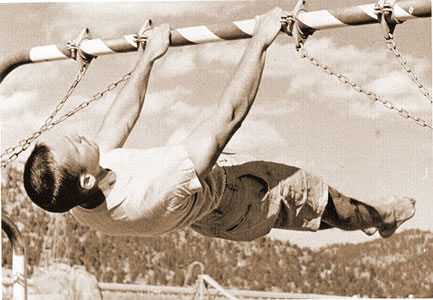
Front lever executed by John Gill - 1962

The move is rated A in the gymnastic code of points, a scale from A to F, with F being the most difficult. In the 1960s the move was rated B, when the levels of difficulty were A, B, and C. Evidently the athlete's body length is a factor in point scoring as world class gymnasts are shorter now than during the mid 20th century: For example, the top American gymnast in 1956 was John Beckner at 1.85m, whereas the 2004 Olympic champion American gymnast, Paul Hamm, is 1.68m. Ultimately, more skilled athletes can complicate the exercise by performing it with only one arm or by spreading the arms wider for more difficulty. By increasing the width of the hands in relation to the shoulders, the angle of inclination of the arms will increase which will cause the dorsals to activate more as well as the rear deltoids. In this way, the arms can be opened to the point where the person is completely parallel to the ground including the arms. This is considered another more difficult exercise in gymnastics, it is the Victorian cross. It is rated E in the FIG code of points.

== Progressions ==
There are progressions available to train the full front Lever. The easiest is the tuck front lever, then the advanced tuck variation (where the back is kept flat), then the single leg front lever, straddle front lever, half lay front lever and finally on to the full front lever. At any stage of learning the skill the athlete may perform pull-ups in the front lever position of their choice.

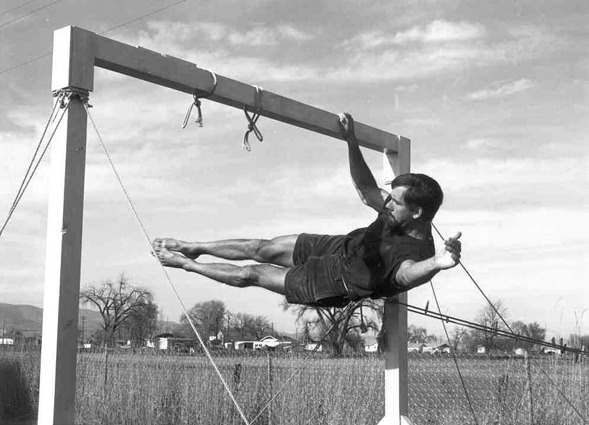
Gill performing a one arm lever in the late 1960s. It approaches a "side" lever as the arm is not in front of the body as with the bilateral front lever or back lever.

=== One arm front lever ===
A front lever held with just one arm. The body is often turned sideways in this variation.

== Exercises based on the front lever ==
=== Front lever pullups ===
The body is kept horizontal while the gymnast performs a pullup. Valid execution requires to break the parallel by getting with elbows under the line of shoulders.

=== Ice cream makers ===
In this variation the performer leans forward from the lever position, bringing the legs down and arms up until the performer reaches the top of a regular pullup. From here they lean back again, straightening the arms and returning to the front lever

=== Front lever raises ===
From dead hang, the body is raised without bending arms until getting to front lever position.

=== Front lever pulls ===
A much more difficult version compared to the previous, the body is pulled from dead hang getting with feet to the bar or rings in vertical position while keeping the lever throughout the entire execution. A more difficult version consists in doing this by starting directly in front lever position, pull, then getting back to front lever position.

== See also ==
- Back lever
- Planche (exercise)
