= Stuart McGill =

Canadian academic

Stuart McGill is Distinguished Professor Emeritus of Spine Biomechanics at the University of Waterloo.

In 2019, he was named a member of the Order of Canada.

== Books ==
- Back Mechanic
- Low Back Disorders: Evidence Based Prevention and Rehabilitation
- Ultimate Back Fitness and Performance
- Gift of Injury
