= Sit-up =

Abdominal endurance training exercise

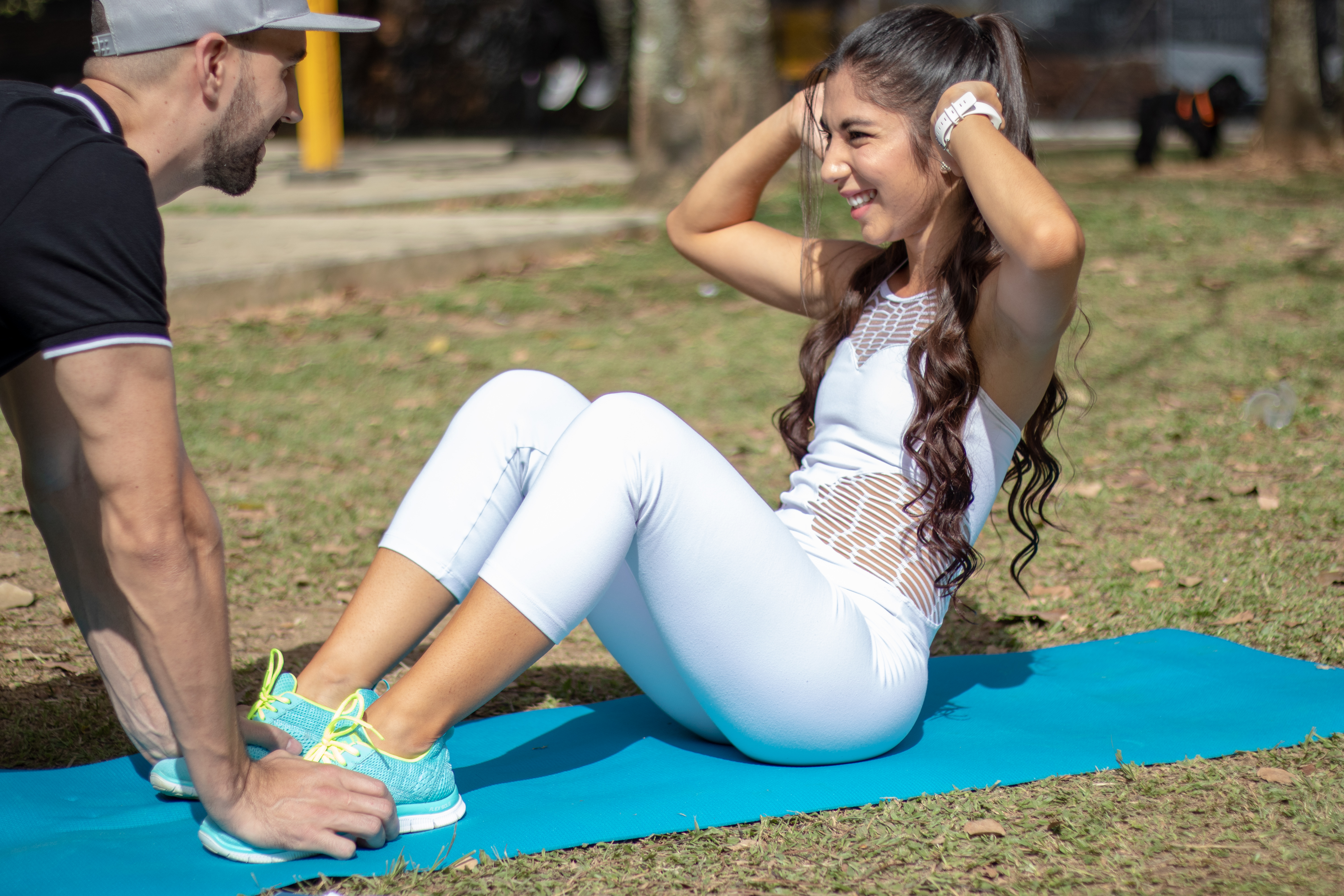
Sit-up form

The sit-up is an abdominal endurance training exercise to strengthen, tighten and tone the abdominal muscles. It is similar to the curl-up (that targets the rectus abdominis and also works the external and internal obliques), but sit-ups have a fuller range of motion and condition additional muscles.

== Form ==

Sit-ups begin with the practicing individual lying with their back on the floor. Typically, this is done with the arms across the chest or hands behind the head. The knees and toes are bent to reduce stress on the back muscles and spine. Both the upper and lower vertebrae are elevated from the floor until everything superior to the buttocks is not touching the ground. Some argue that sit-ups can be dangerous due to high compressive lumbar load and may be replaced with the crunch in exercise programs. Performing alternative abdominal exercises to sit-ups actually increases the ability to do sit-ups.

Sit-ups do not cause the spot reduction of fat at the waist. Gaining a "six pack" requires both abdominal muscle hypertrophy training and fat loss over the abdomen—which can only be done by losing fat from the body as a whole.

=== Variations ===
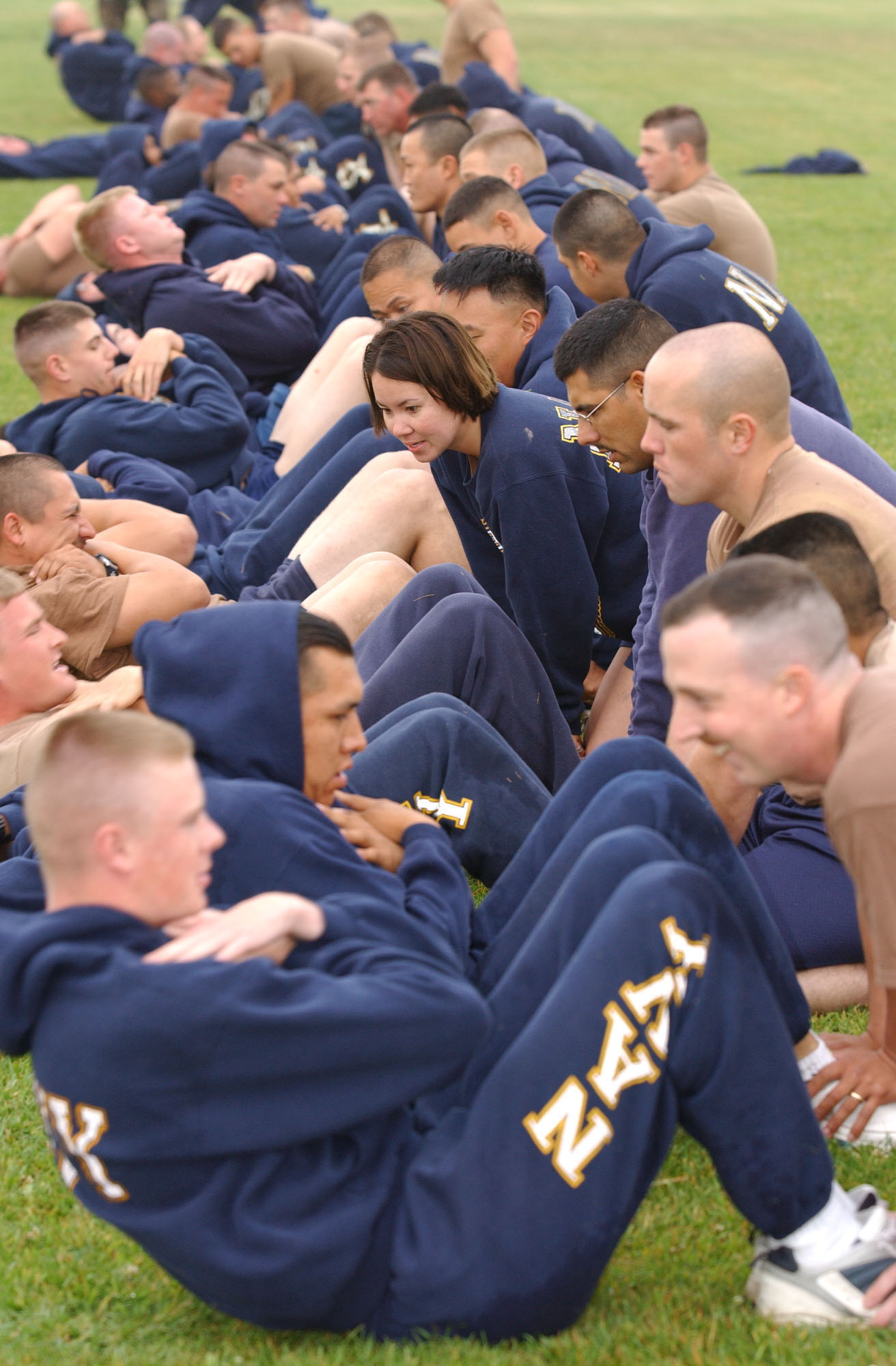
Seabees conduct a situp variation

The movement can be made easier by placing the arms further down away from the head. Typical variations to this include crossing the arms to place the palms on the front of the shoulders and extending the arms down to the sides with palms on the floor. The 'arms on shoulders' variation is also used to make the incline sit-up easier.

More intense movement is achieved by doing weighted sit-ups, incline sit-ups with arms behind neck and even harder by doing the weighted incline sit-up.

== Health risks ==
With improper form, full sit-ups have been found to cause back pain and arching of the lower back, increasing the risk of back injury.

In 2015, it was revealed that every branch of the U.S. armed forces have begun to phase out sit-ups and crunches, due to the high rates of lower-back injury. They have been replaced by planks.

== See also ==
- Crunch (exercise)
- Plank (exercise)
- Squat (exercise)
