= Intermuscular coordination =

Coordination within different muscles and groups of muscles

Intermuscular coordination describes the coordination within different muscles and groups of muscles. These are used for sceletoral movement, stabilisation of joints, as well as stabilisation of body positioning.

The central nervous system is controlling positioning of joints via anticipatory and correcting adaptions of posture, that work against occurring intersegmental forces.

The specific role and hierarchy of certain muscles and their meaning for certain movements is further differentiated within literature.

== Usage ==
Joints are stabilised by interacting muscles, so called synergist muscle. Different synergists feature partial similar functions. Therefore, a certain movement can be formed out of different combinations and participations of muscles acting on a certain joint.

Even muscles not being in a direct connection towards a certain joint can fulfill a stabilising function for that very joint. For a clear specification of any muscles function it is necessary to measure precisely muscular function of not directly involved muscles within certain movements via electromyography.

Complex movement structures are coordinated within the cerebellum via somatosensoric feedback via psychomotoric learning.

=== Examples ===
- Vestibulorcerebellum controls balance and eye-movement. Therefore, view is stable, hull- and thighmuscles are keeping their tension within movements
- Spinocerebellum coordinates activity of armmuscles towards each other
- Pontocerebellum coordinates fingers and their muscle movements
