= Plank (exercise) =

Isometric strength exercise

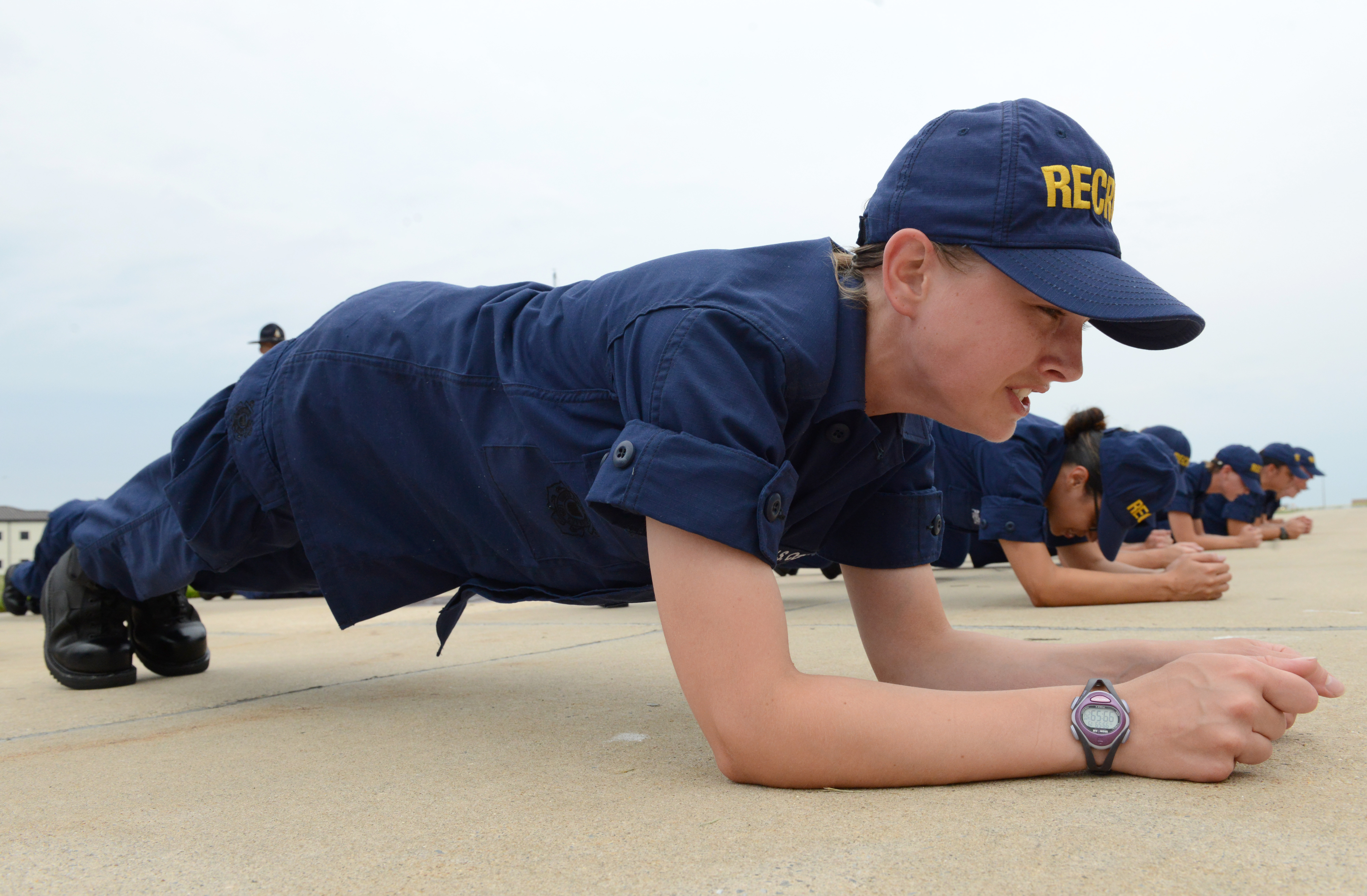
Recruit performing a plank at a US Coast Guard training

The plank (also called a front hold, hover, or abdominal bridge) is an isometric core strength exercise that involves maintaining a position similar to a push-up.

== Form ==
The most common plank is the forearm plank which is held in a push-up-like position, with the body's weight borne on forearms, elbows, and toes. Many variations exist such as the side plank and the reverse plank. The plank is commonly practiced in Pilates and yoga as exercise where it is called Chaturanga Dandasana, and by those training for boxing and other sports.

The "extended plank" adds substantial difficulty to the standard plank exercise. To perform the extended plank, a person begins in the push-up position and then extends the arms or hands as far forward as possible.

== Effect ==
The plank strengthens the abdominals, back, and shoulders. Muscles involved in the front plank include:

- Primary muscles: erector spinae, rectus abdominis (abs), and transverse abdominis.
- Secondary muscles (synergists/segmental stabilizers): trapezius (traps), rhomboids, rotator cuff, the anterior, medial, and posterior deltoid muscles (delts), pectorals (pecs), serratus anterior, gluteus maximus (glutes), quadriceps (quads), and gastrocnemius.

Muscles involved in the side plank include:

- Primary: transversus abdominis muscle, gluteus medius and gluteus minimus muscles (abductors), the adductor muscles of the hip, and the external and internal obliques.
- Secondary: gluteus maximus (glutes), quadriceps (quads), and hamstrings.

A study in British Journal of Sports Medicine of 270 trials found that isometric exercises which involve engaging muscles without movement, such as wall sits and planks, were more effective than other types of exercise for reducing blood pressure.

== World records ==
Guinness World Records lists the record for longest duration of a front plank, resting on elbows, as 9 hours, 38 minutes and 47 seconds set by Josef Šálek from the Czech Republic, in May 2023. The former record of 9 hours, 30 minutes and one second was set by Daniel Scali from Australia in September 2021. Before Scali, veteran Marine officer George Hood set a record of 8 hours 15 minutes and 15 seconds on February 20, 2020. Hood also completed a record attempt in June 2018, holding a plank for 10 hours, 10 minutes and 10 seconds as well as the most cumulative plank time in a 24-hour period of 18 hours, 10 minutes and 10 seconds.

The longest time in an elbow plank:

- by a woman is 4 hr 30 min 11 seconds by DonnaJean Wilde in March 2024 (Canada).
- by a woman with a 60-lb pack is 17 min and 26 sec by Eva Bulzomi (USA) in July 2013.
- with a 100 lb pack is 20 min 03 sec, and was achieved by Xu Qisheng (China) in Guangzhou, Guangdong, China, on 10 November 2022.
- with a 200-lb pack is 4 min 2 sec by Silehm Boussehaba (France) in March 2018.

The longest single-arm plank while balancing on medicine balls is 1 min 20 seconds, by Brandon Westover (USA) in August 2021.

== Gallery ==
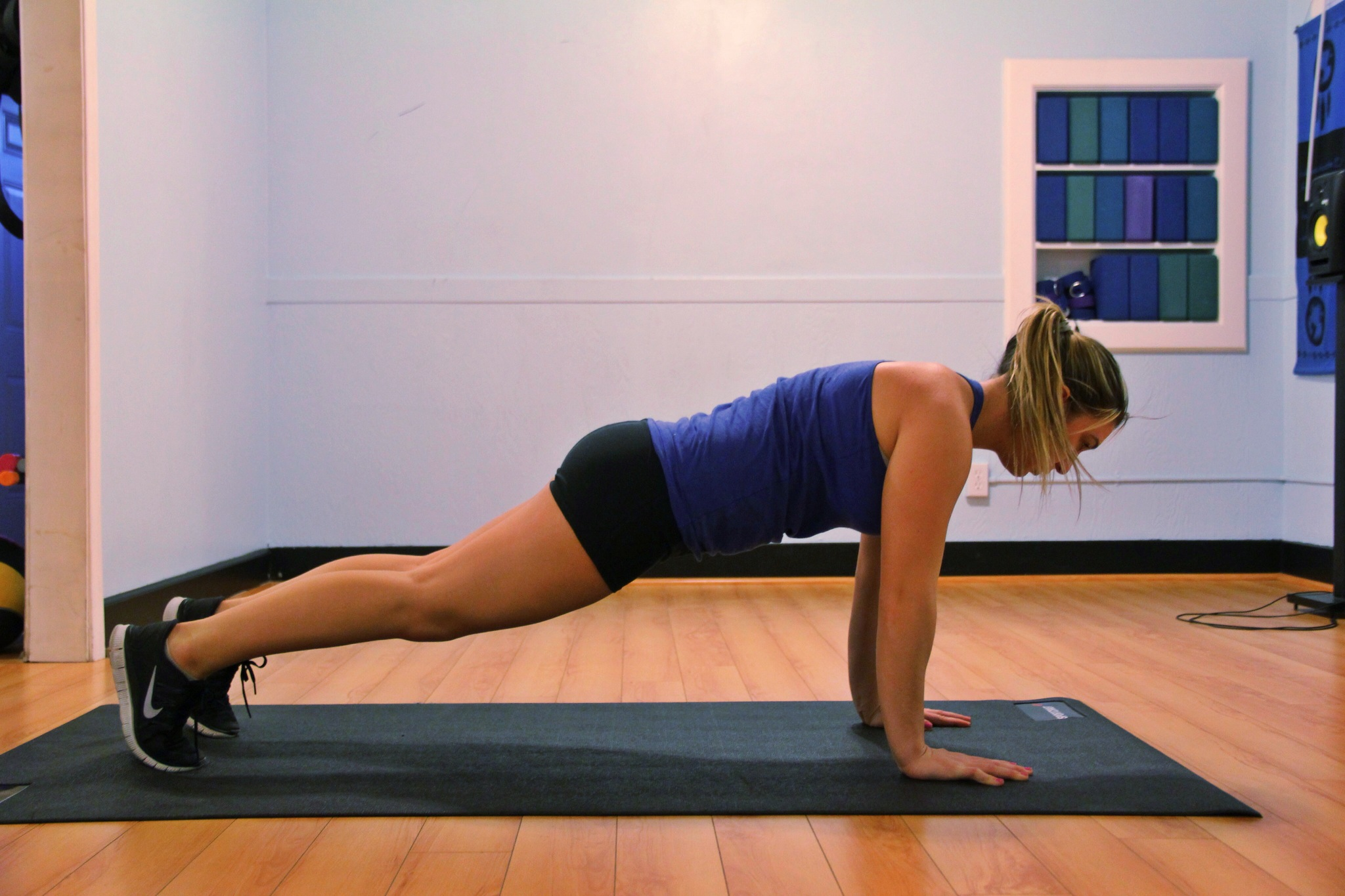
Extended plank

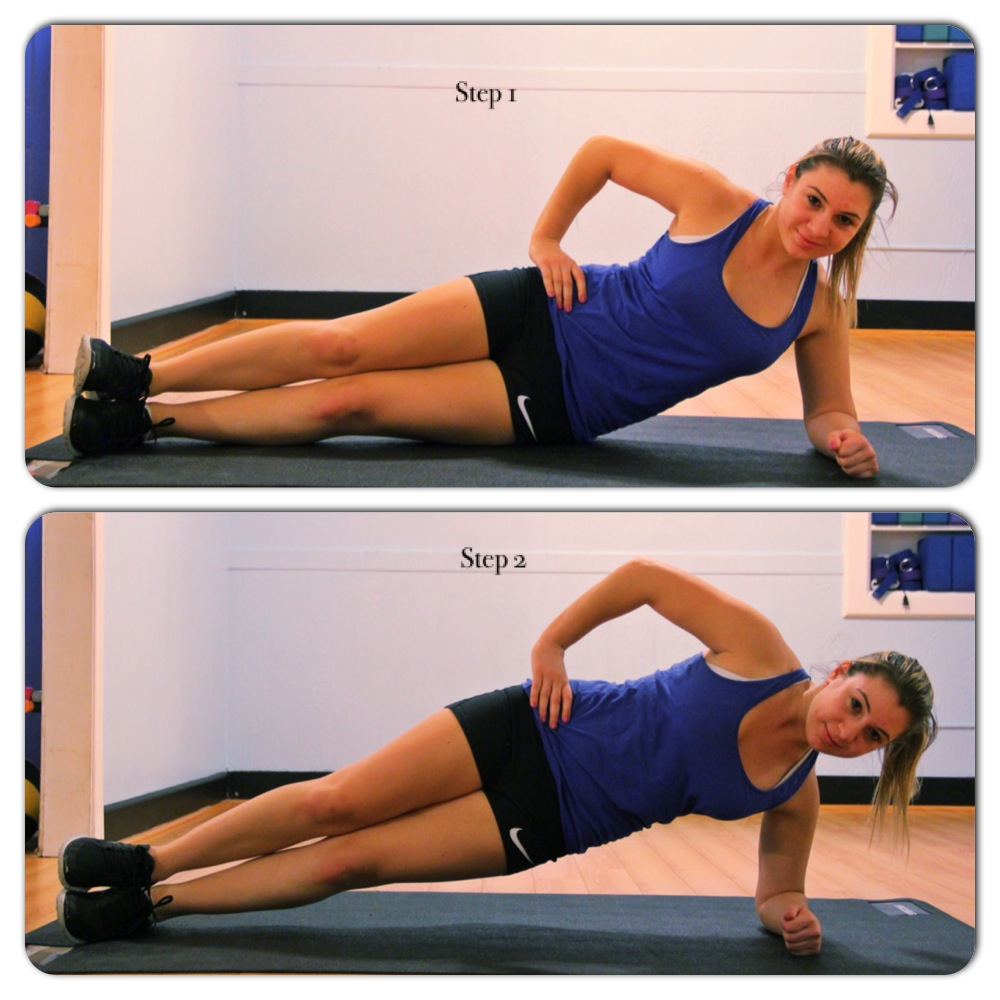
Side plank step by step

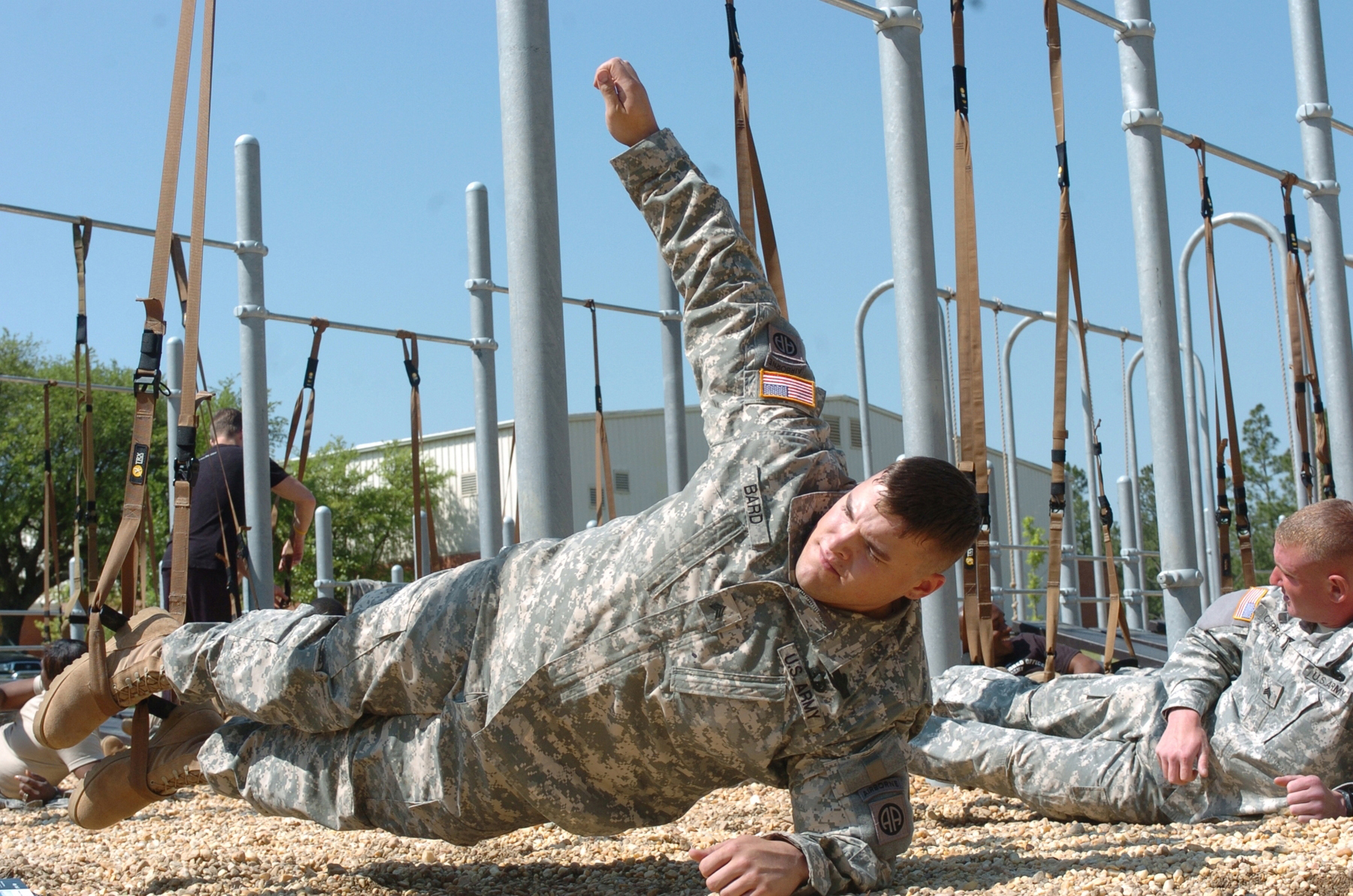
Modified side plank

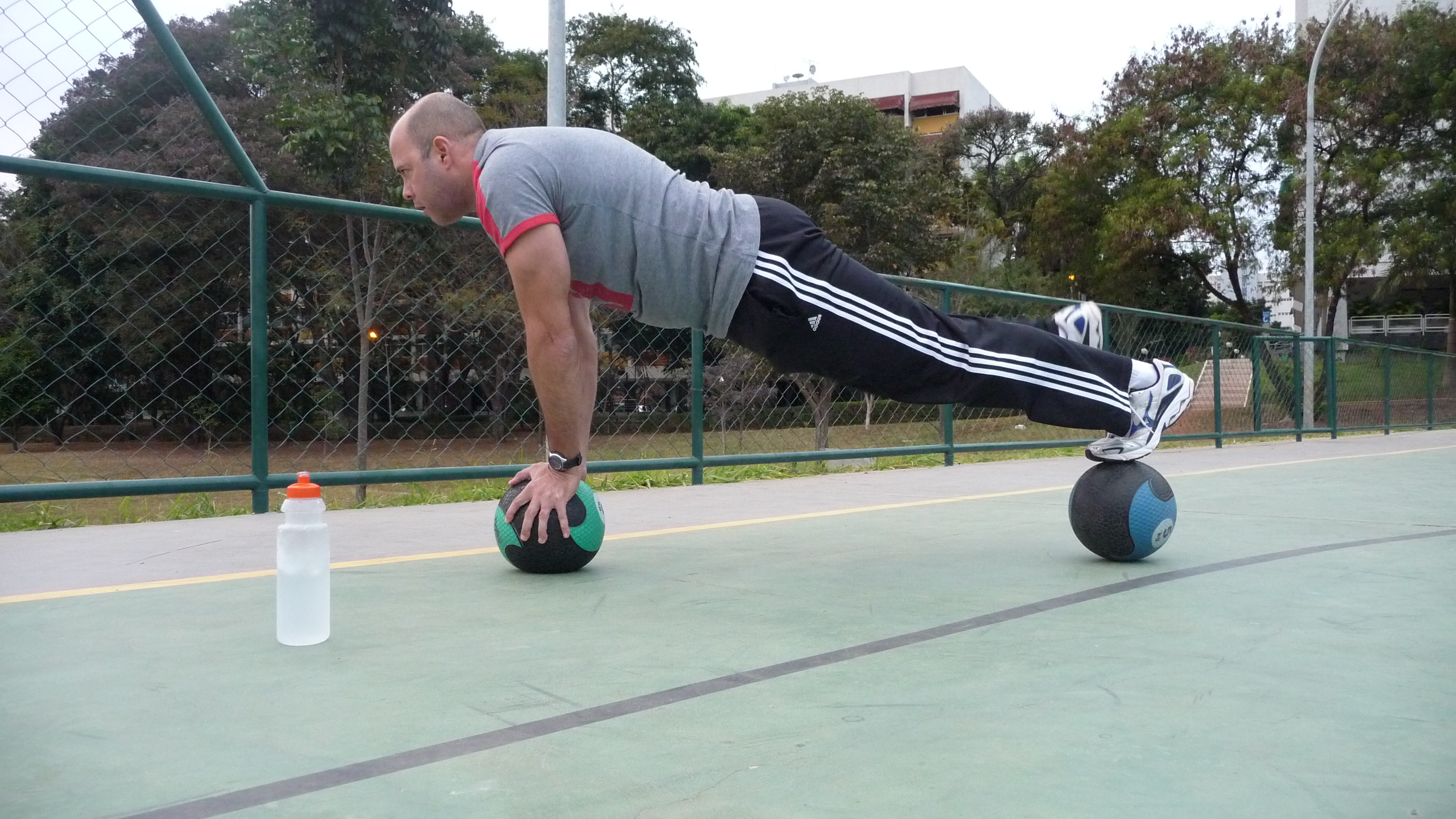
Medicine ball plank

== See also ==
- Chaturanga Dandasana – yoga low plank
- Crunch (exercise)
- Planche (exercise)
- Sit-up
- Vasishtasana – yoga side plank
