= Spot reduction =

Pseudoscientific claim

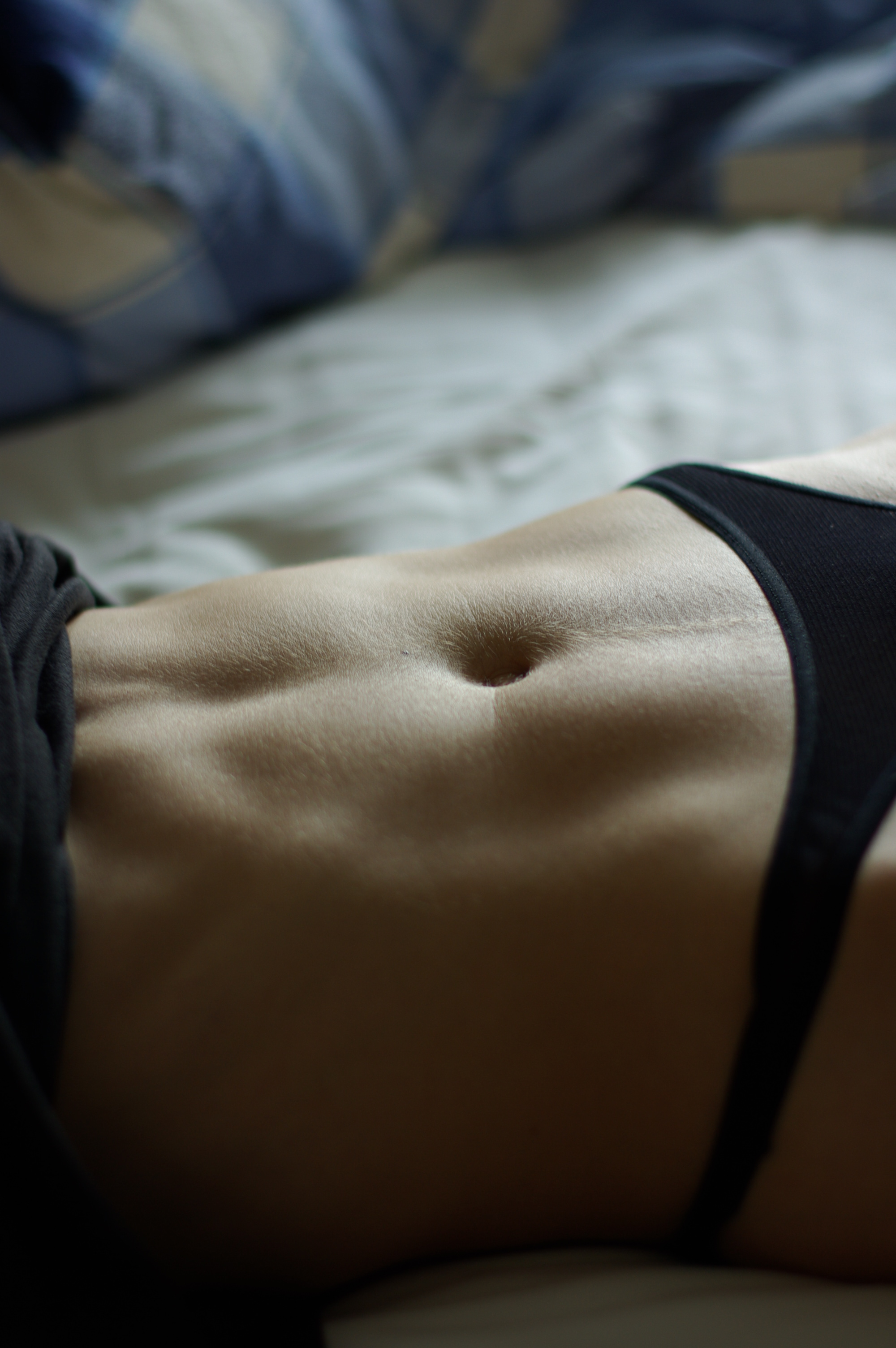
Advertisements and social media will show pictures like this, offering supposed techniques to look toned in specific areas.

Spot reduction refers to the claim that fat in a certain area of the body can be targeted for reduction through exercise of specific muscles in that desired area. For example, exercising the abdominal muscles in an effort to lose weight in or around one's midsection. Fitness coaches and medical professionals as well as physiologists consider the claim to be disproved.

== History ==
Over time it has become clear to trainers and health professionals that the idea of working out certain muscle groups, in order to burn fat in that specific area, is not possible. Advertisements, magazines, internet trainers, and social media continue to push the idea that exercising small isolated muscles, such as abdominal muscles, will help the fat above the muscles disappear. Fitness professionals say this is false, yet even trainers still use phrases like "burning fat" and targeting "troubled areas" like "muffin tops" to pull people in. These phrases are considered misleading to those trying to lose weight. Fat cannot physically "burn" off one's body. The burning feeling people describe when practicing resistance training is caused by the production and accumulation of lactic acid in muscle during exertion via the process of anaerobic respiration, and has nothing to do with the fat surrounding the area. Muscle development and improvement can be shown more easily in lean people. Those who are overweight have a better chance of reducing fat if they increase their overall fitness levels. This can be achieved by doing both high-intensity interval training cardio and resistance training that focuses on gaining muscle mass in both large and small muscle groups. This increase in muscle mass will create a larger need for energy that comes from fatty acids in stored fat cells.

== Misconception ==
It is a common misconception among many people, including professionals, that it is possible to choose where fat can be lost on one's body because of the misleading information fitness settings and the internet are providing. The scientific consensus among experts and researchers is that spot reduction is not achievable. This belief has evolved from the idea that gaining muscle increases metabolism, resulting in fat reduction. People think that fat loss in a specific region could be targeted by building muscle around it. Studies have shown that it is not possible to reduce fat in one area by exercising that body part alone. Muscle growth in a region does not reduce fat in that region. Instead, fat is lost from the entire body as a result of diet and regular exercise.

== Research ==
All body shapes are different, meaning people carry fat in different places. Moreover, research suggests that variation in both overall adiposity and regional fat distribution is highly genetic. Some locations on the body are more metabolically active than others, and those areas will lose weight quicker than those that are not as metabolically active. For many people, abdominal fat is more metabolically active and can be reduced easier than fat in the lower regions of the body. The reduction of these metabolically active sites is not due to an increase in abdominal muscle contractions. While exercising, fatty acids are being mobilized due to the presence of hormones and enzymes. These create a negative energy balance in the body. Fat is reduced over the whole body. Exercise of certain muscles cannot signal a specific release of fatty acids for the specific fat deposits above those muscles being activated.

=== Muscle growth vs fat reduction in human body ===
In a randomized control study, scientists sought to determine a link between skeletal muscle size and surrounding fat on a specific body part when exposed to strength training. They compared the muscle and fat content of high-caliber tennis players' dominant and non-dominant forearms. The method used in this study to examine the amount of subcutaneous fat between the tennis players' arms, was a skinfold caliper. (There are a multitude of tests that can help determine body fat percentage). After measuring the two arms, they found that the girth of the dominant arms was greater because these muscles were used more than the non-dominant arm muscles. However, the skinfold measure showed no difference if the amount of subcutaneous fat on either of the arms. This proved that the muscles on the dominant arms grew due to hypertrophy of the muscle, yet the amount of fat surrounding the muscle on the dominant arms was not reduced from this increase. There was no proof of spot reduction taking place.

=== Abdominal exercise vs abdominal fat ===
In another randomized study, scientists divided 24 sedentary adults, ages 18–40, into an exercise group and a control group. The exercise group added 7 abdominal exercises, 2 sets of 10 reps each, 5 days a week, for 6 weeks, into their daily routines. The scientists discovered that at the end of the 6 weeks, through comparing a variety of endurance tests, body composition tests, and anthropometrics, the subcutaneous fat around the abdominal region did not shrink. However, muscular endurance of the core region did improve when comparing the before and after of the number of sit-ups between the post-study exercise group and control group. Therefore, even though an increase in muscular development of a certain region in the body could take place, it did not remove the fat around the muscles. Again, there was no proof of spot reduction taking place.

== See also ==
- Toning exercises
- Weight loss
- Human body weight
