= Human flag =

Exercise where the body is parallel to the ground supported by a vertical bar

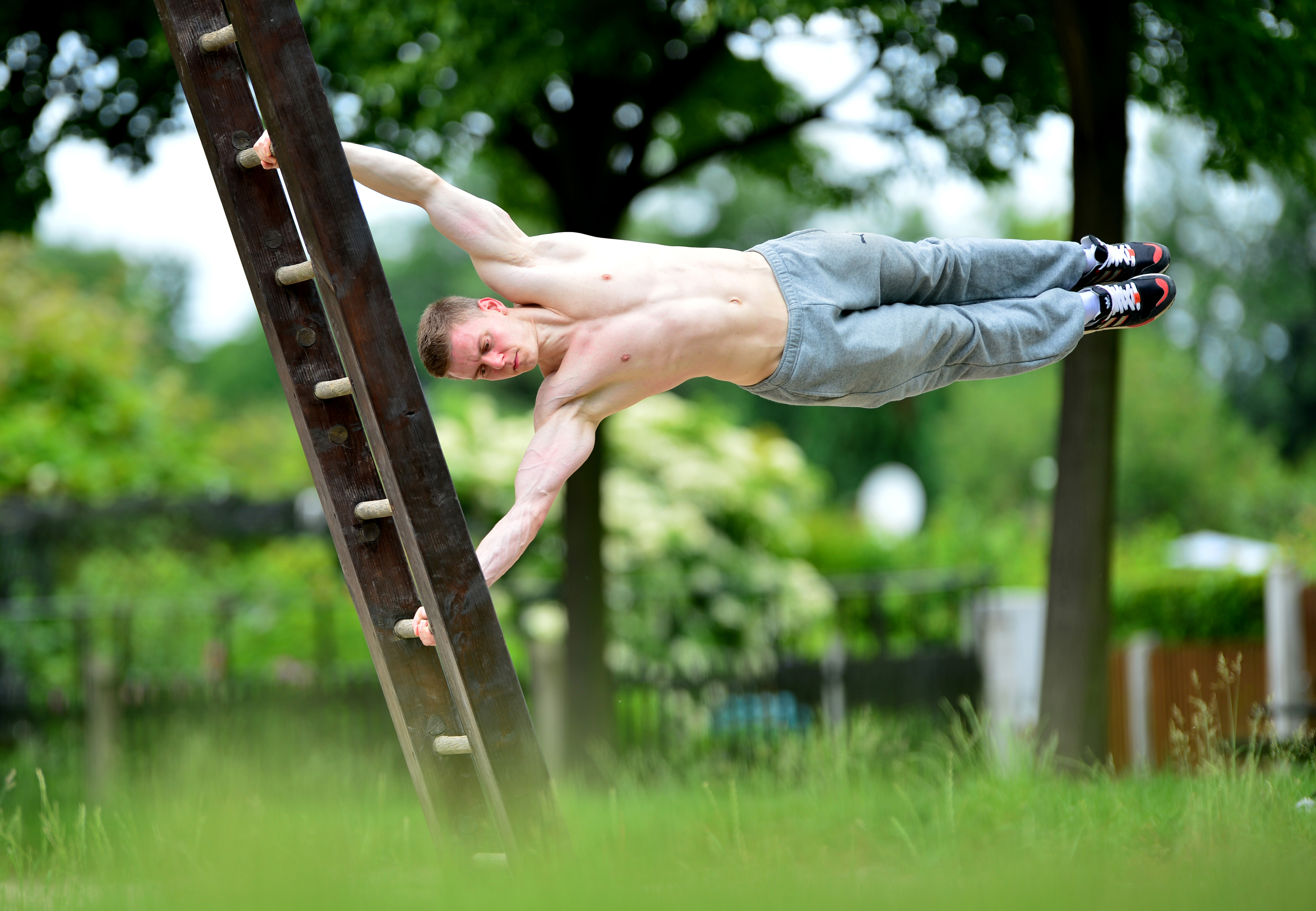
Human flag on a diagonal ladder

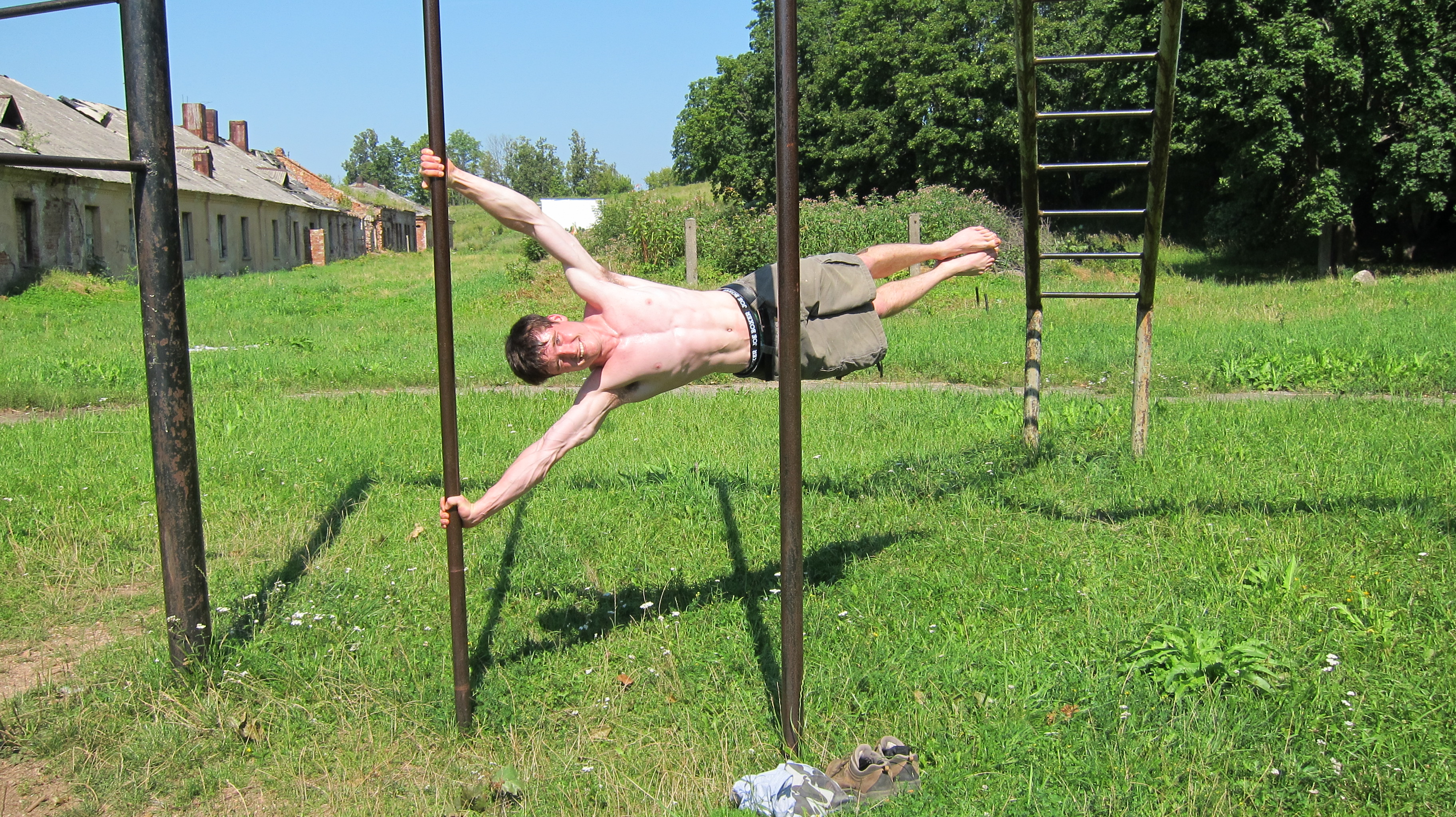
Overhand grip human flag on a pole

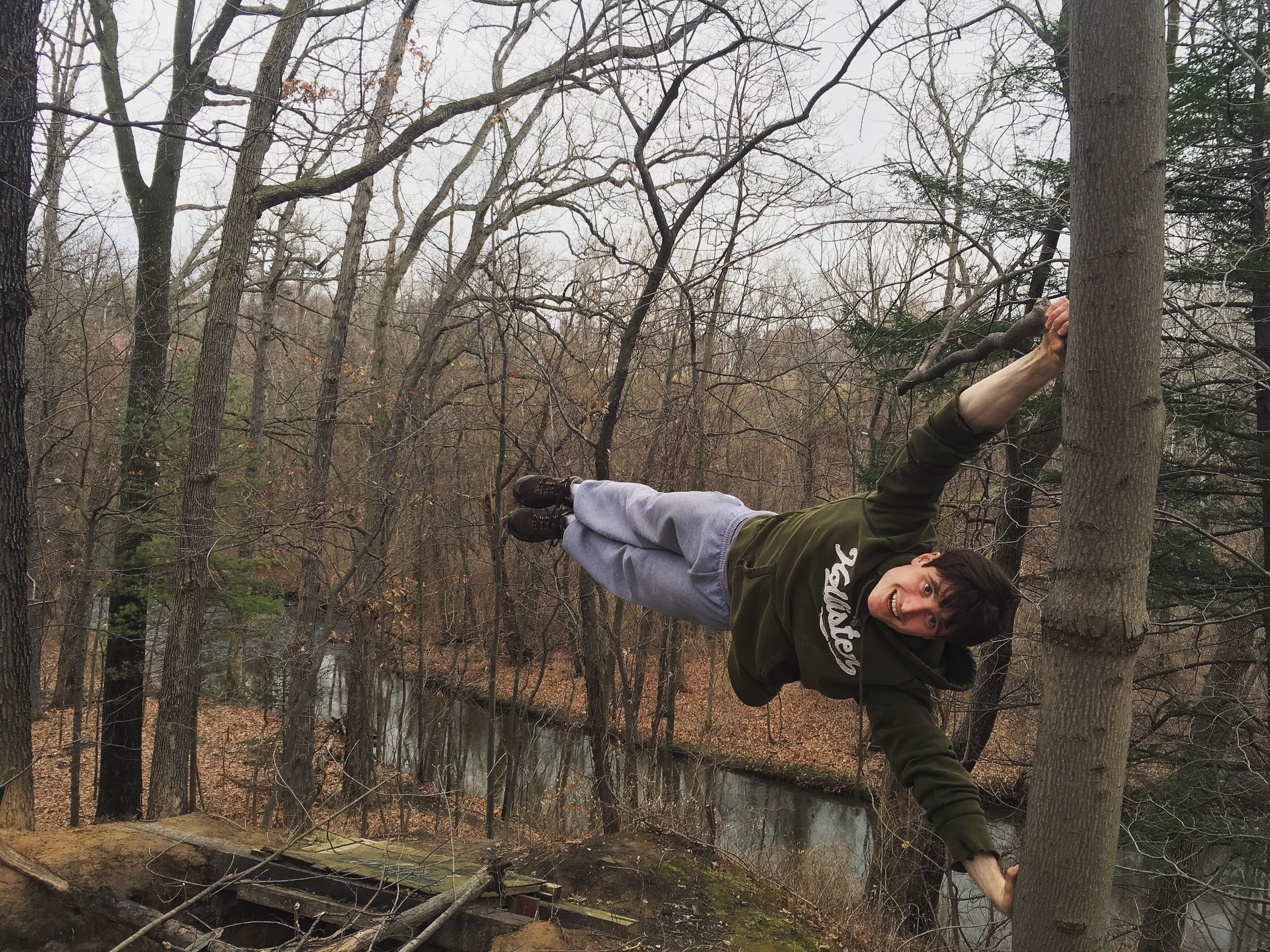
Human flag using a tree

The human flag (known as an iron X in pole sports) is a feat of strength where the body is parallel to the ground supported by a vertical bar. A straight line is formed using the arms and body. The trick requires the performer to have immense upper body strength.

== Technique ==
The bottom arm is usually turned to grip the pole and is straight to "push" the body up. The top arm faces forward and grips on the pole. This arm "pulls" the body to maintain a parallel position to the ground. Easier variations include hooking one arm over the pole or by having the legs straddled, tucked or raised.

Learning the hold is generally done by starting with the legs parallel to the pole and then slowly lowering them to the ground. Tucking or straddling the legs alleviates pressure on the abdomen, also making the move much easier to hold.

== Variations ==
Harder variations include:

- Human Flag Pull-ups: A pull-up performed while in a flag position.
- Overhand Grip Human Flag: A human flag where both hands are facing forward.
- Human Flag Raises: A human flag where the body is raised to the pole and back down.
- Straddle Flag
- Arm Lever Flag

== World record ==
The Guinness world record for longest human flag held stands at 1 minute and 5.71 seconds by Wang Zhonghua.
