= Cal State Fullerton Titans tennis =

CSUF Titans Tennis
- Founded: Women's: 1966; 60 years ago Men's: 1960 (dissolved 1987; 39 years ago)
- University: California State University, Fullerton
- Head coach: Ellie Johnson (women's) (3rd season)
- Conference: Big West; Division I Division
- Location: Fullerton, California, US
- Home Court: Titan Courts
- Nickname: Titans
- Colors: Navy blue, white, and orange

NCAA Tournament appearances
- 1985 (Women's, Div I), 1967 (Men's, Div II), 1975 (Men's, Div I)

The Cal State Fullerton Titans women's tennis team competes at the NCAA Division I Collegiate level and is a member of the Big West Conference. All home collegiate tennis matches are played at the California State University, Fullerton, Titan Courts, located in Fullerton, California.

The Cal State Fullerton Titans men's tennis team first fielded a team in 1960 and disbanded after the 1987 season.

== History of women's program ==
=== Coach Dr. Jean A. Barrett years (1966–68) ===
Dr. Jean A. Barrett started at Orange State College (known now as Cal State Fullerton) in 1963 she was a professor of Health, Physical Education and Recreation at Fullerton,, getting her degree's a B.S. from Cortland State Teachers College in 1952 and an Ed.M. from the University of Buffalo and an Ed.D. from State University of New York at Buffalo. Barrett was a pioneer in Physical Education and Women's Athletics at CSUF she was the first female faculty member in the Physical Education Department (now the Department of Kinesiology). Barrett served 28 years at the university and served a number of leadership roles there also. Barrett like the former Titans Men's Tennis Coach Ernest A. Becker who started also the Titan Men's Tennis Program mentored her tennis student-athletes while she was coaching her teams. In the school year 1966–67 she was the Titans Women's Director of Intercollegiate Activities and started a Women's Tennis Program at Cal State Fullerton and they were known as the Titanettes Tennis Team they had nine matches that season and was off to a good start according to their leader Barrett. One of the first Women Tennis letterwinners from that starting season in 1967 to play for Barrett was former La Habra Highlander High School tennis player Cindy L. Gohring a senior class student-athlete at Cal State Fullerton that school year. In 1967 the Titans and Barrett were in the overall national picture for women collegiate athletics called The Division for Girl's and Women's Sports, which set the standards for intercollegiate competition but does not allow women's athletic scholarships, this lasted until 1972. In 1967 it formed the Commission on Intercollegiate Athletics for Women and begins offering national championships in many sports including tennis the Individual National Singles Champion from that year was Patsy Rippy of Odessa College and doubles title went to Jane Albert and partner Julie Anthony of Stanford. In 1968 the USLTA sponsors the first National Team Championship in Women's Intercollegiate Tennis and known now as Trinity University (Texas) coached by Shirley Rushing wins the team title and Emilie Burrer also of Trinity University (Texas) wins the Individual National Championship for singles and doubles that year with partner Becky Vest. For the 2016–17 season for the current Titan Women's Team it will be the 50th anniversary since the Tennis Program for Women was started at Cal State Fullerton.

=== Coach Virginia Scheel years (1968–1973) ===
The Titans women's varsity tennis team first started competing in the 1967–68 academic school year the year Coach Scheel's first came to CSUF and finished eight in their conference. Scheel had a Titan tennis team/program financial budget when she started of $100.00 for the season. Scheel was a professor of Kinesiology and Health Promotion at Fullerton and was a grad from La Verne College now known as (University of La Verne) she was also after her tennis coaching career at Fullerton was the president of Western Society of Physical Education of College Women for academic year 1984–85 this society was founded in 1921 and deals with issues and concerns related to disciplines in higher education and human movement the group of women represents colleges from the western territory of Canada to Hawaii to Utah and down to Arizona she was a well rounded collegiate coach. The 1970 Titan squad had a record finish of first in the conference in only their third year of competing in collegiate women's tennis. In 1972, Coach Virginia Scheel's Titans had an undefeated women's tennis season, according to the coach. In the 1973 CSUF women's season, Scheel's team, led by number 1 singles player a former transfer student-athlete from Fullerton Junior College Hornets Sue Marta, had a victory, defeating the USC Trojans in that year also the Titans women's tennis program also moved up in league class to the "A" bracket. Marta also had a career high impressive victory over Cal State L.A. Golden Eagle Tina Watanabe their Number 1 player on the team and a 1973 NCAA National Collegiate Singles Tournament finalists that was held in Auburn, Alabama Watanabe had victories on the Women's Pro Circuit over Tracy Austin, Steffi Graf and Monica Seles and had a World Singles Ranking of 79th at one point in her professional career. Another standout Titan tennis player on that 1973 team is Michelle Rauland who after competing on that '73 team in January 1974 competed with the professional women tennis players at one of the circuit stops for the Virginia Slims Tour in Mission Viejo, California the tournament was played on hard courts and Rauland was beaten in the early rounds by Penny Johnson 1–6, 2–6 the winner of the tournament was Chris Evert beating in the finals Billie Jean King 6–3, 6–1 in 1974 the prize money for the tournament was $50,000 for the professionals.

Standout Titan individual women tennis performers in singles and doubles under Coach Virginia Scheel tenure:

- 1970, 1971, 1972: Dawn Crossen-Wilson '73
- 1970, 1971, 1972: Kathy Blonder '75

=== Coach Jean Davenport years (1973–1976) ===
Coach Jean Davenport's, a Virginia State University grad with a "MS" from Michigan State the Titan Health Ed. Instructor coached the 1975 Titans Team which was led by a Junior Fullerton's number No. 1 player Kathy Wright a former Stanford University player during her first year there. Davenport's said her team's greatest assets are persistence and strict conditioning. The team also achieved academic excellence in the classroom with an overall GPA of 3.3 and Davenport said this Titan team has a record wide age range on the team with student tennis athletes 18 to 45 with the eldest player being an Orange Coast College transfer student-athlete named (Republic of Ireland) Eileen Stephens who competed on the Titans team as a junior class and senior class member at the age of 44 and 45 years old.

Standout Titan individual women tennis performers in singles and doubles under Coach Jean Davenport tenure:

- 1973, 1974: Sue Marta
- 1974: Kathy Wright

=== Coach Jan Billings years (1976–1982) ===
In a historic time for Division I Women's Athletics Ellen Linderman '81 who played on the 1977, 1978 and 1979 Titan squad's was one of the first women to receive an Athletic Scholarship because of Title IX from the Athletic Department by Coach Jan Billings at that time in the program at the university. The 1980 Titans squad was led by a number 1 freshman player named Pia Tamayo who was also a member of the Philippines Federation Cup Team and went three sets, losing (6–2, 2–6, 0–6) to tennis professional Hana Mandlíková from the Czechoslovakia Fed Cup Team; the match took place in Santa Clara, California. Tamayo as an international junior tournament player competed at The Wimbledon Championships "Girls Singles Bracket" playing in 1978, 1979 and 1980 defeated in each year in the second round after winning her first round matches in '78 losing to (United States) Anna-Maria Fernandez 2–6, 3–6 and in 1979 to (United Kingdom) player Sonia Davies 6–7, 6–3, 5–7 and in 1980 after her first year for the Titans to another (United Kingdom) player Kate Brasher 1–6, 6–2, 4–6. Tamayo played one successful year for the Titans and went on to finish her collegiate career at Princeton University and was a 3-time All-Ivy League Tennis Selection for the Tigers. Carol Christian who played her 1980 first year/season as the number No. 2 singles player behind Tamayo on the Titan team, she played at Pacific High School in San Bernardino, Ca. during her junior's years and as a junior player she played Tracy Austin and lost 0–6, 2–6 in the finals of The 31st Annual Fullerton Junior Tennis Tournament. Christian won the Singles and Doubles Titles at The National Indoor Girls' Tennis Championships at Mt. Clemens, Michigan and she was also ranked No. 1 in singles in Southern California Sectionals in the girls' 14-and-under class as a junior player. Christian also during the 1980 Titan season beat Cal Berkeley's top singles player as her highlight victory of that season. She had an 8–2 record in the league in singles and had a 1–1 record against UCLA's Becky Bell the No. 2 singles player for the Bruins, the league again as in the past was the toughest in the nation with conference members like UCLA, USC, Arizona State, Arizona, Long Beach State and San Diego State these school's were in top ten rankings in many season's year in year out in Division I Women's Tennis nationally. As a sophomore Christian played her last season in 1981 as a Titan as the number No. 1 singles player on the team and played with her Pacific High School teammate Sherrie Shellhammer on that Titan team for Coach Jan Billings. Christian went onto playing professionally in 1984 competing in the US Open, Wimbledon and French Open and in 1988–89 years competed in the Australian Open along with the US Open and French Open her highest singles professional ranking was No. 111 on August 1, 1988, and her highest doubles ranking was No. 199 December 21, 1986. Christian was honored by Southern California Tennis Association as for women tennis players from 1960 to 1980 in the "SoCal So Good" article of tennis individuals who have made an impact on the game locally by the Southern California Tennis Hall of Fame that took place on July 20, 2002.

Billings coached from 1977 to 1979. Recently retired UNLV women's basketball coach (2008-2020) - who also is the former UCLA women's basketball coach from (1993-2008) - Kathy Olivier played on the Titans women's tennis team during those two season/years in the late 1970's, when Olivier attended Cal State Fullerton as a student-athlete known by her name Kathy Ricks.

Standout Titan individual women's tennis performers in singles and doubles under Coach Jan Billings tenure:

- 1977: Jodi Foster
- 1978, 1979: Karen Peterson
- 1980: Pia Tamayo
- 1980, 1981: Carol Pat Christian
- 1982: Kristi Blankenship '86

=== Coach Bill Cole years (1982–83) ===
Coaching record (1 Year/Season, 5 Wins–23 Losses)

The 1983 Titans women's team was led by first year Coach Bill Cole '87 MS who played collegiately from 1975 to 1977 at the University of Buffalo in a conference so tough that four of which members were ranked in the top five nationally overall which included teams like UCLA, USC, Stanford and San Diego State. Under Cole's direction that year he said he established various goals for his team and was highlighting personal improvements of the Titans players because the team's competition was far greater that year in the conference than other conferences and the season was a success for the players in those terms with the goals they laid out for the year.

Standout Titan individual women's tennis performers in singles and doubles under Coach Bill Cole tenure:

- 1983: Kristi Blankenship '86

=== Coach Bill Etchegaray years (1983–85) ===
Coaching record (2 Years/Seasons, 17 Wins–44 Losses)

The 1985 team was coached by the former Cal State Los Angeles Golden Eagles tennis player Bill Etchegaray and led by number 1 singles player Kristi Blankenship '86 who had a (30–10) senior season won-loss record, was selected at the end of that year by the NCAA Regional Committee to participate in the NCAA Division I Women's Singles Tennis Championship Tournament held at Oklahoma State University in Oklahoma City, Oklahoma. Blankenship represented the Titans very well was defeated in the tournament by University of Miami Hurricanes talented "All-American" and top 16 seeded player in the championships Lise Gregory by a score of (5–7, 4–6). A year later in 1986 Blankenship '86 won The Ojai Women's Open Invitational Singles Championship/The Foothill Cup defeating Kathy May-Paben who formerly had a professional tennis ranking of number 10 in 1977. Blankenship '86 joins other past notable champions Maureen Connolly in 1951, Billie Jean King in 1965 and 1966, Tracy Austin in 1977, USC's Stacy Margolin in 1976 and 1978, USC's Cecilia Fernandez 1982 and 1983, Stanford's Patty Fendick in 1985 who have won the prestigious Ojai Tennis Tournament.

Standout Titan individual women's tennis performers in singles and doubles under Coach Bill Etchegaray tenure:

- 1984, 1985: Kristi Blankenship '86

=== Coach Brad Allen years (1985–89) ===
Coaching record (4 Years/Seasons, 48 Wins–55 Losses)

In 1986, the Titans women's tennis program was almost discontinued by the Athletic Department. Athletic Director Ed Carroll's plan was to drop as many minor sports as possible (diving, golf, & men's tennis were dropped) to increase the funding for the football program. A.D. Ed Carroll tried to drop the women's tennis program in a closed secret meeting. However, the board of regents did not agree and the women's tennis program was not discontinued. Newly hired Titans Women's Tennis Coach, Brad Allen, found out about the attempted elimination of the program when he read it in the school newspaper. Coach Allen was hired in December 1985 four weeks prior to the start of the 1986 season and the team had no coach for the previous six months because the athletic department hoped the program would be discontinued.

The first year for Coach Allen was extremely difficult because the team budget was $5,000 and his competitors had a $50,000 budget. The first-year team budget paid for the team to buy enough tennis balls for practice, home matches, and uniforms, but no money was left for travel, equipment, or scholarships. The team lost almost all of their matches that first year. Allen had a (48–55) career record over four seasons with 20 of those losses coming in that first year. Coach Allen was able to save and promote the tennis program through record fundraising of about $11,000 a year and unknown to the players, he wrote scholarships from his own checkbook. Allen and the team sold fireworks, beer at UCLA football games, held tennis clinics and USTA sanctioned tournaments, and more to raise money. Now, with the increased budget through fundraising Allen was able to add more talented players. Since the 1987 season, Allen's Titans squad held the team record for most victories in a season with 15 wins and had the first winning season in the Titan's Division 1 history. During the years 1986–1989, the Titans had winning seasons three years in a row.

The Titans highlights were wins over Loyola Marymount, Nebraska, Cornell, Cal State Los Angeles, and conference wins over San Jose State, UNLV, UC Irvine, UOP, and Long Beach State. Another highlight came in 1989 against Harvard University when Kelli Moore and Caroline Sporer split sets against the #2 ranked doubles team in the nation. Harvard won the first set 6-4 and the Titans won the second set 7-6 and had the momentum. The Harvard team already had enough points to win the overall team match and the Harvard coach refused to play the third and final doubles set out of fear of her players losing the match and dropping their national #2 ranking. Coach Allen said, "In my opinion, Kelli Moore and Caroline Sporer were one of the best doubles teams in the country!"

Coach Allen was fired in 1989 by A.D. Ed Carroll after Allen filed a grievance against the athletic department based on his annual salary of $4,800 and a team budget of $5,000 a year. Coach Allen won the grievance after it was decided his firing was obvious retribution for filing the grievance. Coach Allen laughingly said, "Firing a coach that set school records for wins, fundraising, the number of student-athletes on the Honor Roll, and positive media coverage, including being on the front page of the Los Angeles Times Sports section would have been impossible to prove." Allen won his job back and could have returned as head coach at a significantly higher salary. However, Coach Allen declined the offer because he had already moved out of state, purchased a new home, and was preparing for his upcoming marriage. Coach Allen stated, "I'll never forget my time at Fullerton and especially I loved my time on the tennis courts with the team. I will forever be proud of the outstanding team members. They gave their all on the tennis courts and the entire team was always on the Honor Roll as well. I love them all and I am grateful for the opportunity I had to work with and to know such fine young ladies."

Prior to joining the Titans Women's Tennis Program and Coach Brad Allen's squad for the 1988 season player Nicole Brechtbuhl won the 1986 California Junior College State Doubles Individual title her freshmen year and in 1987 Brechtbuhl won the California Junior College State Singles Individual title in her second year.

Standout Titan individual women's tennis performers in singles and doubles under Coach Brad Allen tenure:

- Jennifer Aafedt '90
- Nicole Brechtbuhl '90
- Colleen Duignan '91
- Kelli Moore '91
- Caroline Sporer '92

=== Coach Bill Reynolds years (1989–2013) ===
Coaching record (24 Years/Seasons, 178 Wins–391 Losses)

In 1992 Titans Roseann Alva '94 with her performance came out of nowhere to get into the finals in the number No. 1 flight singles championship round of The Big West Conference Women's Collegiate Tennis Championship Tournament only to lose to her competitor from UC Santa Barbara (2–6, 2–6) in the final, coincidentally in the 1992 season the Titans women's tennis team never won a match all season. The year before in 1991 Alva '94 and Titan teammate Kelli Moore '91 made Big West First Team Doubles All-Conference as a result from the successful season performance for the doubles pair.

The women's team has enjoyed much success over the years as a member in the Big West Conference since the 1988. Under Reynolds tenure with standout individual performances in singles and doubles by players:

- Kelli Moore '91
- Roseann Alva '94
- Caroline Sporer '95
- Debbie Vonusa '98
- Eleanor Luzano '02
- Amy Medlin '03
- Summer Tantee
- Carla Rocha '05
- Adriana Hockicko '06
- Ana Iacob '06
- (Romania) Ioana Sisoe '06
- (Turkey) Ruya Inapulat '07
- Gina Le '07
- Mal-Ly Tran '07
- Kalika Slevcove
- Tiffany Mai '14
- Morgan McIntosh '14

- In the 1999–00 school year Titan women's tennis player Poornima Swaminathan '00 received the "Titan Female Scholar Athlete of the Year Award" while playing for her Titan Coach Bill Reynolds.
- In 2006 Titan women's tennis player Ruya Inalpulat '07 who played No. 1 Singles and Doubles her senior year received the "Arthur Ashe Scholarship Award" for outstanding achievements both on and off the tennis court.

Titans Former women's tennis Coach Bill Reynolds has had the longest coaching tenure at Fullerton, coaching the team from 1989 to 2013, with a total of 178 career match victories. His most successful season according to wins was the 1991 season where the Titans had 15 victories that season the most for a season in his Titan career and his team that year was led by Roseann Alva '94 and Kelli Moore '91 with highlight victories over Oregon, Colorado, Washington, Boise State, Long Beach State and Fresno State. In 2013 Reynolds was named "Big West Conference Co-Tennis Coach of the Year". Reynolds '72 played collegiately and graduated from UC Santa Barbara where his father was the former head tennis coach there.

=== Coach Dianne Matias years (2013–2021) ===
Coaching record (8 Years/Seasons, 109 wins–60 losses)

Midway through the 2016 season the third-year Titans Coach Dianne Matias the former USC Trojans (2004–2007) collegiate tennis player has led the Titans Team as of March 8, 2016 as the new rankings came out as mentioned midway through the season to a No. 67 national ranking by Oracle/ITA Division I Women's Collegiate Tennis Rankings. Currently rated No. 1 is Cal Berkeley and from the west is Pepperdine at No. 17, Stanford at No. 23, UCLA at No. 25, USC at No. 43. The Titans squad's led by Co-Captains Alexis Valenzuela '17 and Camille De Leon '17 current team record on the season is 10 wins – 1 loss as to the reasoning for their deserving current national ranking. For Division I for the Titans Women's Tennis program this is a historical feat this has not been done before as a Division I program.

On April 2, 2016, the current Titan Women's squad surpass the single season historical record for wins in a season of 15 from Coach Brad Allen's 1988 team with a victory over UC Irvine 6–1 to give them their 16th victory on the year so far and a current record of 16–3. The victory against UC Irvine snapped a losing streak against the Anteaters which dated back to 1998.

On April 12, 2016, the new Oracle/ITA Collegiate Division I National Women's Tennis Doubles Rankings came out and the Titans doubles team of Alexis Valenzuela '17 & Camille De Leon '17 were given a ranking of 45th in the nation quite an accomplishment for the Titan tennis duo who are 13–1 on the season currently. The last time historically a Titan women's tennis player was in the national spotlight was back in 1985 when Kristi Blankenship '86 competed/qualified in The NCAA Division I Collegiate National Women's Tennis Singles Championship Tournament in Oklahoma City, Oklahoma.

On May 4, 2016, following a record-setting season for the Titan Tennis team third-year Coach Dianne Matias was voted Big West Conference Women's Tennis Coach of the Year. Matias led the team to a (17–6) record on the season and the most Big West Conference victories (6–2) in a season and a 3rd-place finish in the conference with a winning percentage of (.739) and also a ranking of No. 67 in the nation by Oracle/ITA Collegiate Tennis Women's Rankings. This is the second Conference Coach of the Year award won by a Titan coach the first was won by Coach Bill Reynolds in 2013 for their season then.

On June 2, 2016, the final Oracle/ITA Collegiate Division I National Women's Tennis Doubles Rankings came out for 2015–16 season year end rankings and the Titan doubles team of Alexis Valenzuela '17 & Camille De Leon '17 were given a ranking of 56th in the nation for the season.

On April 29, 2018, in team format of the 2018 Big West Conference Tournament Championships the Titans made it to their first ever "Big West Conference" finals before they were defeated by University of Hawaii 2–4 for the championship prior to this result their only conference title was in 1970. Also at stake for the conference champion was an automatic berth in the 2018 NCAA Division I Women's Tennis Team Format Championship Tournament. The Titans defeated Cal Poly Mustangs in the semi-finals of the conference championships 4–0 on Saturday and with their loss in the finals they finished their season with a record of 20–6.

On May 31, 2018, No. 3 Singles player Karla Portalatin on the Titans squad to compete for the Dominican Republic team in Fed Cup play the event is known as the World Cup of Women's Tennis. Portalatin team will compete in Metepec, Mexico on June 18–23, 2018 for her home country the last Titan woman tennis player to compete in Fed Cup was Pia Tamayo who played for the Titans in 1980. Portalatin in Fed Cup competition played Barbados on June 20, 2018, and her country won 2 to 1 as Portalatin competed in doubles with her partner Kelly Williford and won over the Barbados doubles team of Gabrielle Leslie and Tangia Riley-Codrington 6–2, 6–1 and on June 22, 2018, Portalatin and her country competed against Mexico and were beat 3 to 0 as Portalatin and her doubles partner Kelly Williford lost to the Mexico doubles team of Daniela Morales Beckmann and Maria Jose Portillo Ramirez by a score of 1–6, 3–6 at Club Deportivo La Asuncion in Metepec the format was played as a round robin competition as Portalatin country Dominican Republic finished second of the three countries competing in the 2018 Fed Cup Americas Zone Group II-Pool A with the top team (country) in each pool advancing to Group I.

On June 6, 2018, the final season team rankings came out and the Titans were ranked 81st nationally by ITA and also ranked 7th in the Southwest Regional team rankings along with No. 1 Singles player Genevieve Zeidan ranked in the Southwest Regional at #17 individually.

Standout individual performances under Coach Dianne Matias tenure since 2013–14 season in the Big West Conference in singles and doubles by players:

- Alexis Valenzuela '17
- Camille De Leon '17
- Morgan McIntosh '14
- Megan Sandford
- Sarah Nuno
- (Dominican Republic) Karla Portalatin
- (Taiwan) Genevieve Zeidan

== History of Titans men's tennis program ==
=== Coach Dr. Ernest "Ernie" A. Becker years (1960–1962) ===
The Cal State Fullerton Titans Tennis team was started first with a men's varsity team in 1960 started by Dr. Ernest Becker who was the founding dean of students at Orange County State College which is now known today as California State University, Fullerton and also was a philosophy professor joined the school in 1959 and also became the first director of athletics. Becker known as "Ernie" to everyone was an Amherst College grad and "Mammoths" tennis letterman as a player on the team and received a graduate degree in "Divinity" and a doctorate degree in "Higher Education" from the University of Southern California, he started his professional career as a journalist working at one time for "The Christian Science Monitor" and other news organizations. He was the first men's tennis coach and known as a father figure for the young team and also was enjoying practicing with the team and having annual faculty exhibition matches against the varsity team with such faculty members as Thomas Ashley, Nish Jamgotch, Orrington Ramsey, Ronald Calhoun, Lee Kerschner and of course Dr. Becker. He was a true pioneer in getting this men's Titan tennis program started at Fullerton. He had Mitchel Saadi '64 as the "Team Captain" in the early years of the program and also Becker had tennis professional Stan Smith's brother Ken Smith Jr. on the Titan team. Becker in 1940 while in India was playing tennis matches with the "Maharaja of Patiala" and his Prime Minister. Becker during World War II was playing exhibition matches and was a practice player hitting balls and getting tips on the game with legendary tennis professional Bill Tilden and also tennis pro Vinnie Richards as well as National Doubles Champion and Davis Cup Team Captain Gardnar Mulloy, Davis Cup member Wayne Sabin and National Women's Doubles Champion Helen Marlow through playing matches with these notable players he was adding more knowledge of the game by the time he started the Titans Men's Tennis Program and coaching his players during those early years of the Program. Becker retired in 1977 at Cal State Fullerton as he held his final position at the school of "Director of the Career Placement Center". Coach Becker died on January 5, 1998, he was 83 years old.

Standout Titan individual men's tennis performers in singles and doubles under Coach Dr. Ernest A. Becker tenure:

- Mitchel Saadi '64

=== Coach Neale R. Stoner years (1963–1964) ===
The next men's tennis coach at Orange State College taking over for Coach Thomas J. Ashley who also was a political science professor at that time in 1963 was Coach Neale R. Stoner the future Cal State Fullerton Titans director of athletics from (1972–1979) and tennis enthusiast for a season and a half coaching the tennis team in Fullerton, Ca.. During this time period in which the Titans tennis team was involved in from 1963 to 1966 Cal State Los Angeles dominated the Division II Small College Division for Men's Tennis winning the "National Team Championship Titles" three years and Runner-up one year in a four-year span coached by Scotty Deeds and led by national individual champion players Gilbert Rodriquez, Gary Johnson, John Lee and also Joe Huey. In a team dual match on March 9, 1964, the Titans competed against Cal State Los Angeles and the Titans were defeated that day Coach Stoner tabbed Cal State Los Angeles "the best small college team around and said the Titans had bitten off more than they could chew". On the 1963 team the Titans had a female student-athlete on the squad because there was no Titans women's team until the 1966–67 school year by the name of Rosalie Passovoy '63 who beat the number-6 player on the team and earn a spot and a letter on the team, her doubles partner on the team was Ben Wade '63. Former Anaheim High School and UCLA Bruins 1959 tennis letterman transfer Mike Bouck was the number 1 Flight Singles player on the 1962–63 Titans team had very good results with Orange State College(CSUF) played two years with the team but prior to that as a Bruin in that 1959 season his team won the PAC-8 Conference and had a 15–1 team record that was coached by collegiate tennis legendary Coach J.D. Morgan (161–18 collegiate record from 1951 to 1966) who Bouck played with four All-Americans on the team that included 1959 PAC-8 Singles Champion Allen Fox, Roger Werksman, Dale Rohland and Norm Perry a very strong UCLA Bruins team that year. Bouck in 1957 competing one year/season for Fullerton Junior College teamed up with Mr. Nelson in The Ojai Valley Men's Junior College Doubles Tennis Championships Division and were finalists in The Frank T. Heffelfinger Challenge Cup there at Ojai losing to future Cal State Los Angeles player Gilbert Rodriquez and partner Eduardo Guzman of Modesto Junior College both of them were finalists in the Singles Championship play that year. On the 1963–64 Titans squad was former Fullerton Junior College Hornet tennis player Stan Kula a legend in Orange County, California tennis circles who was their top player on that '64 Titan team and back in 1959 Kula from Anaheim High School was the CIF High School Individual Doubles Champion with doubles partner Don Kliss that year. In a dual match on April 21, 1964, the Titans took on arch rival Long Beach State College (known now as Long Beach State University) Kula the Titans number 1 seed/man on the team beat highly ranked national collegiate player John Allgood of the 49ers in singles 8–6, 4–6, 6–2, Allgood in his collegiate tennis career was seeded in the top eight for the National Collegiate Men's Tennis Championships held in Los Angeles also in that dual match with the 49ers Kula and his teammate partner Mike Bouck won also in doubles but the Titans team was outlasted by the depth in the 49ers lineup and were beaten in that dual team match. Kula after college beat many touring tennis professionals like Rod Laver, Stan Smith, Pancho Gonzales, Bob Lutz and even Billie Jean King and was also the Titans coach for the 1965 season.

Standout Titan individual men's tennis performers in singles and doubles under Coach Neale Stoner tenure:

- 1963: Mike Bouck
- 1964: Stan Kula '67

=== Coach Dr. Michael Yessis years (1966–1969) ===
In 1967 first year Titans Head Men's Tennis Coach Dr. Michael Yessis a College of New York grad and a professor of Physical Education at Fullerton said "We have a small squad and we have a very rough schedule – rougher than the previous year" in that year. Yessis also commented on the existing Titan Tennis Courts saying "The courts are slow, which handicaps an attempt to play a fast attacking game". "New construction at the courts may remedy this situation" says Yessis the athletic department has plans to supplement the tennis facilities at that time with four new tennis courts hopefully by the 1968 season according to Yessis. Titan tennis player's Steve White '68 an Antelope Valley Junior College transfer and Jose Nino '68 a "Two-Time Titan Team MVP" played in the 1967 NCAA Men's Division II Tennis Championships at Cal State University, Los Angeles and the NCAA Men's Tennis Team Championship was won by conference member Long Beach State University led by Fred Suessmann and Dennis Trout. From 1967 to 1973 the NCAA Men's Division II National Tennis Team Championship Title's went to a CCAA Conference member each year from those seven seasons with outstanding coaches within the conference like Long Beach State Coach Dan Campbell, Cal State Northridge Coach Dave Sterle, UC Irvine Coach Myron McNamara and Cal State Los Angeles Coach Scotty Deeds and that is why in the 1969 season again Titans Tennis Coach Dr. Michael Yessis said "We are in the toughest league in the State" second only to the Pac 8 Division I Men's Tennis Conference, really in the nation during that time period.

Standout Titan individual men's tennis performers in singles and doubles under Coach Dr. Michael Yessis tenure:

- Steve White '68

=== Coach Bob Osborn years (1970–1971) ===
The 1971 CSUF Men's team led by Bruce Westforth a transfer student athlete from Fullerton Junior College recorded the most wins in a season from when the program started in the early sixties to then with a record that season of (15 wins-12 losses) but had a losing record in there conference(1971 Conference Tennis Champion San Fernando Valley State College which is now known as Cal State Northridge Matadors) said Titans Coach Bob Osborn "You have to credit a strong conference and some good players" Osborn went on to say "We had a team with a good attitude and good efforts in every match". Osborn coached the Titan Men's team that one school year, he was also an assistant men's basketball coach under head coach Alex Omalev and was a graduate of Whittier College in 1958 where Osborn was "All-S.C.I.A.C. Honors" in basketball.

=== Coach Craig Neslage years (1971–1974) ===
The 1973 Titans team led by Coach Craig Neslage had quite a fiery tennis player named Oscar Meyer, a Cal Poly Pomona Bronco transfer and a former member of the Mexico's Davis Cup Team, who played for the Titans at the No. 1 position for two years . Neslage coached the Titans from 1971 to 1974 for three seasons and one of the issues he tangled with was the fan area loyalty to the tennis program during those years. He said "Fullerton area has no loyalty the problem is obvious he diagnose and confirmed the disease that has spread throughout at Fullerton" during his time period. Neslage was an outstanding fundraiser for the Titans Men's Tennis Program by the time he moved on after the 1974 season in his career he left the Program with a budget better than when he started with the Program, the next coach was in a better situation financially for the Program in 1975. Neslage was an All-American collegiate tennis player at UC Irvine during his playing days. After serving for his country in the Vietnam War the honorable veteran Paul McWherter came to play for the 1973–74 Titans after competing successfully for Bellevue Junior College in the State of Washington where he was the 1972–73 Junior College Singles & Doubles Champion there in the State a good find for Coach Craig Neslage and while playing one year at CSUF he played number No. 2 and No. 3 Singles for the Titans while playing with ambidextrous strokes and serving righthanded. One of Neslage's players Mark Hamilton '75 a few years after graduating from Fullerton went on to be the men's tennis coach for the Texas Tech Red Raiders for seasons 1979 and 1980 and had a coaching record of 24 wins-29 losses during his two-year career there and also is recorded as being the 2nd men's coach in their history of there tennis program.

Standout Titan individual men's tennis performers in singles and doubles under Coach Craig Neslage tenure:

- 1972: Bruce Westforth
- 1973: Alan Foster, Dave Sallee
- 1974: Oscar Meyer

=== Coach Ron Witchey years (1974–1979) ===
(Assistant Coaches: Jonathan Walters '76, 1975–76 Season and John Nordstrom '78, 1976–1978 Seasons)

In the 1974–75 academic year, when the Titans Men's Tennis program became a member of the Pacific Coast Athletic Association (PCAA), they moved up to the Division I large school level and added a new tennis coach named Ron Witchey, a Denison University graduate. He took over the last part of the 1975 season taking over from short term Titan Coach Steve Warfield, who was a 1970 Division III All-American from the University of Redlands during his playing days. Witchey was a former Titan Track coach from 1965 to 1972 and cross country coach. Witchey quickly became a better organizer and manager of the tennis team, according to team captain Gary Quandt. Witchey worked on mental toughness, physical conditioning, and developing a positive attitude. In the 1976 and 1977 seasons the Titans men's team added many new players like their No. 1 singles player Bob Goldstein, Mt. SAC Junior College transfer twin brothers Mike Duran and Gil Duran, a two-fisted forehand/backhand player, Kelly Davidson, Gregg Henderson, Phil Beilin and Pete Fischer who competed in the PCAA Conference in singles or doubles. The team finished third in 1976 and second in 1977. In a highlight result in the 1976 season, brothers Mike Duran and Gil Duran were finalists in The Ojai Men's Independent College Doubles Championship/The Joseph O. Bixler Trophy, only to be defeated by Jeff Williams-Bob Wright of UC Irvine. The 1979 Titans were led by Dave Barrows, who was a finalist in the number 4 singles that year, losing to a player from UC Irvine. San Jose State Spartans won the PCAA conference team competition that year, while UC Irvine Anteaters finished second.

1975 NCAA Men's Individual Singles & Doubles Division I Tennis Championships held in Corpus Christi, Texas on June 20, 1975, participated by Titan players:

- Pete Fischer '79 lost "Singles 1st Round" to opponent Gary Albertine, LSU Match Score: 0–6, 6–4, 3–6
- Gregg Henderson lost "Singles 1st Round" to opponent Glen Holroyd, Arizona State University Match Score: 4–6, 1–6
- Gary Quandt '75 lost "Singles 1st Round" to opponent Mark Brandenburg, University of Minnesota Match Score: 1–6, 1–6
- Duane Stotland '75 lost "Singles 1st Round" to opponent Alejandro Hernandez, BYU Match Score: 0–6, 2–6
- Gregg Henderson-Pete Fischer '79 lost "Doubles 1st Round" to opponents Gary Plock-Graham Whaling, University of Texas Match Score: 3–6, 2–6
- Duane Stotland '75-Keith Christman '78 lost "Doubles 1st Round" to opponents Rich Andrews-Mike Greenberg, University of Washington Match Score: 4–6, 0–6

PCAA Men's Titan Individual Singles & Doubles Conference Champions and Runner-up's during Coach Ron Witchey tenure:

- 1976 Phil Beilin, No. 6 Singles Flight Champion (Opponent: Chuck Phillips, San Jose State Match Score: 6–4, 6–1)
- 1976 Pete Fischer '79-Gregg Henderson, No. 2 Doubles Flight Runner-up (Opponent: Geoff Martinez-Kirk Terrell, Long Beach State Match Score: 4–6, 4–6)
- 1977 Bob Goldstein, No. 1 Singles Flight Runner-up (Opponent: Nial Brash, San Jose State Match Score: 4–6, 0–6)
- 1977 Mike Duran, No. 2 Singles Flight Champion (Opponent: Matt Iwerson, San Jose State Match Score: 6–4, 7–6)
- 1977 Gregg Henderson, No. 5 Singles Flight Runner-up (Opponent: Don Paulsen, San Jose State Match Score: 6–2, 1–6, 4–6)
- 1977 Gil Duran '79-Kelly Davidson '77, No.3 Doubles Flight Runner-up (Opponent: Matt Iwerson-Don Paulsen, San Jose State Match Score: 5–7, 6–2, 6–7)
- 1979 Dave Barrows '81, No. 4 Singles Flight Runner-up (Opponent: Paul Oldenburg, UC Irvine Match Score: 3–6, 2–6)

=== Coach Paul K. Miller year (1979–1980) ===
(Assistant Coach: Jim Worth)

The 1980 Titans Men's Tennis team was led by senior player and team captain Dave Barrows '81 and newcomer Tim Giller both were the top players on the team and during the season Giller had the only highlight victory of the regular season in singles against Pepperdine University two-time All-American Division I Singles Collegiate tennis player Richard Gallien that went three sets in the Titans 1-8 dual match loss to the Waves. That year/season in 1980 the assistant coach Jim Worth a military veteran and inspiration to the Titan team players from Brea, California who was hired by Coach Paul K. Miller was a wheelchair competitive tennis player in Southern California and was a pioneer with "International Tennis Hall of Famer" Brad Parks, David Saltz and Dave Kiley in starting a circuit/tour for competitive wheelchair tennis players with grand slam tournaments all around the world and wheelchair tennis is played in over 100 countries today.

Standout Titan individual men's tennis performers in singles and doubles under Coach Paul K. Miller tenure:

• 1980: Dave Barrows '81

• 1980: Randy Friend '83

• 1980: Tim Giller

=== Coach Jan Billings years (1980–1982) ===
(Assistant Coach: Dave Barrows '81, 1980–81 Season)

In the early eighties under Coach Jan Billings the backbone of the Titans team was players Frank Ellis '83 and Michael Moore '84 who competed through the ups and downs of the men's tennis program. Billings who coached both the men's and women's Titan squad's from 1979 through 1982 3 years total during that time period and coached the women's team a total of 6 years. Billings had help with the 1980–81 Men's team with former Titans player Dave Barrows '81 was the assistant coach for the season.

Standout Titan individual men's tennis performers in singles and doubles under Coach Jan Billings tenure:

1981, 1982: Randy Friend '83

1982: Michael Moore '84

=== Coach Ed Burt years (1982–1984) ===
Then came in toward the early mid-eighties was Coach Ed Burt who brought in talented recruits and the tennis program was on the rise again with the additions of English junior college player by way of Florida (England) Julian Lowin '85, Donny Young, South African player (South Africa) Craig McSmythe (1983 Ojai CIF H.S. Interscholastic Doubles Champion/The Wightman Cup/(Indio H.S.), William Schuster '85, Tim Macres, David Pratt and Everette Brunelle (1983 Ojai CIF H.S. Interscholastic Doubles Champion/The Wightman Cup/(Indio H.S.) These Titans teams were competing with collegiate tennis powerhouse's on their schedule like highly nationally ranked USC Trojans and also highly nationally ranked Pepperdine Waves along with San Diego State Aztecs, Boston University Terriers, South Carolina Gamecocks, Princeton Tigers, Nebraska Cornhuskers, University of New Mexico Lobos, University of San Diego Toreros and PCAA Conference highly national ranked foes UC Irvine Anteaters and Long Beach State 49ers at the time, even Division III number one nationally ranked opponent University of Redlands Bulldogs was really good during that time period on the Titans schedule. During Burt's short tenure the Titans had many victories against competitive school's likely due to their recruits and their depth in the line up of the Titan team. One of the individual highlights from the 1984 season was (England) Julian Lowin '85 victory in a singles flight match in a dual match against UC Irvine Anteaters player Bruce Man Son Hing who was the 39th nationally ranked NCAA Division I Collegiate singles tennis player in 1984 according to the "ITCA Intercollegiate National Final Rankings" Lowin won 6–1, 6–7, 7–5 in a tremendous match but in the hard-fought dual match UC Irvine won 5–4 over the Titans by a point.

Standout Titan individual men's tennis performers in singles and doubles under Coach Ed Burt tenure:

•1983, 1984: (England) Julian Lowin '85

•1983, 1984: Michael Moore '84

•1984: Donny Young

=== Coach Mike Muscare years (1985–1987) ===
The 1986 team was led by Fausto Bucheli '87 and had a new coach named Mike Muscare who last coached the season before for the CSUSB Coyotes but the season for the Titans had again a competitive Division I collegiate schedule with many tough opponents in their PCAA Conference. The 1987 team had better success of the 2 years coached by Muscare in which the Titan team had 15 victories on the season 3 of the victories the team beat military academies Army, Navy and Air Force and were led by No. 1 singles player (Morocco) Driss Benomar '88. (India) Sanjeev Khanna '91 is the last known varsity intercollegiate Titan men's tennis player that played in the last season for the men's tennis program in 1987 for the CSUF varsity tennis team that competed in the PCAA Conference to have graduated from California State University, Fullerton.

Standout Titan individual men's tennis performers in singles and doubles under Coach Mike Muscare tenure:

1986: Fausto Bucheli '87

1986, 1987: (Morocco) Driss Benomar '88

== Conference membership history ==
=== Women's ===
- 1966–1970: AIAW
- 1971–1976: SCWIAC (Southern California Women's Intercollegiate Athletic Conference)
- 1976–1984: Western Collegiate Athletic Association
- 1984–1985: PacWest
- 1986–1988: Pacific Coast Athletic Association
- 1989–present: Big West Conference

=== Men's ===
- 1960–1962: Unknown
- 1962–1964: NAIA
- 1964–1966: Ind./Col/ Dist. III
- 1967–1974: California Collegiate Athletic Association/Division II
- 1974–1987: Pacific Coast Athletic Association/Division I

== Conference school rivals ==
- Long Beach State 49ers
- UC Irvine Anteaters

== Championships ==
=== Titans NCAA Tennis Championship appearances ===
Year/Season	NCAA Div. I Women's Individual Tournament Appearance	NCAA Div. I Men's Individual Tournament Appearance	NCAA Div. II Men's Individual Tournament Appearance	Women's Players Name	Men's Players Name	Location of NCAA Tennis Championships
1984–85	Yes	–	-	Kristi Blankenship '86	–	Oklahoma State University
1974–75	-	Yes *Accepted not had to Qualify	-	-	Keith Christman '78	Corpus Christi, Texas
1974–75	-	Yes *Accepted not had to Qualify	-	-	Pete Fischer '79	Corpus Christi, Texas
1974–75	-	Yes *Accepted not had to Qualify	-	-	Gregg Henderson	Corpus Christi, Texas
1974–75	-	Yes *Accepted not had to Qualify	-	-	Gary Quandt '75	Corpus Christi, Texas
1974–75	-	Yes *Accepted not had to Qualify	-	-	Duane Stotland '75	Corpus Christi, Texas
1966–67	-	-	Yes	-	Jose Nino '68	Cal State University, Los Angeles
1966–67	-	-	Yes	-	Steve White '68	Cal State University, Los Angeles
NCAA Div. I & II Titans Individual Tennis Championship Tournament Appearances

== Women's team results ==
=== Yearly Titans Women's Varsity Tennis historical results/standings ===
Year	Coach	Record	Conference	Record/Finish	Roster
1966–67	Dr. Jean A. Barrett, Emeritus	Unknown	AIAW	Unknown	Cindy L. Gohring '67(Capt.)
1967–68	Dr. Jean A. Barrett, Emeritus	Unknown	AIAW	8TH	Unknown
1968–69	Virginia L. Scheel, Emeritus	Unknown	AIAW	4TH	Georgiann Schuessler, Barbara Spiker '71
1969–70	Virginia L. Scheel, Emeritus	7-0	AIAW	1ST	Kathy Blonder '75, Dawn Crossen-Wilson '73, Beverly Knippel '72, Georgiann Schuessler, Barbara Spiker '71 (Capt.), Toni Starke, Chris Tiscareno, Flo Wilson
1970–71	Virginia L. Scheel, Emeritus	6-1	SCWIAC	2ND	Kathy Blonder '75, Dawn Crossen-Wilson '73, Betty Friedrich, Beverly Knippel '72, Jane Porphir ‘74, Georgiann Schuessler, Barbara Spiker '71 (Capt.), Toni Starke, Kim Stewart, Chris Tiscareno, Flo Wilson, Dee Yox '72
1971–72	Virginia L. Scheel, Emeritus	6-1	SCWIAC	2ND	Kathy Blonder '75, Dawn Crossen-Wilson '73 (Capt.), Betty Friedrich, Sue Marta, Jane Porphir '74, Judy Simon '77, Dee Yox ‘72
1972–73	Virginia L. Scheel, Emeritus	Unknown	SCWIAC	Unknown	Kathy Blonder '75, Debbie Dulay, Gaye Grill, Sue Marta (Capt.), Michelle Rauland, Nancy Vince '75, Carolyn Wright
1973–74	Jean Davenport	Unknown	SCWIAC	Unknown	Jan Billings '75, Gaye Grill, Sue Marta (Capt.), Vicki Slikkerveer, (Republic of Ireland) Eileen Stephens '76 Nancy Vince '75, Kathy Wright '74, Carolyn Wright
1974–75	Jean Davenport	Unknown	SCWIAC	Unknown	Pat Anthony, Jan Billings '75 (Co-Capt.), Merrill F. Bernhardt ‘76, Elaine M. Chandler ‘78, Nancy B. Cook ‘78, Jilda E. Davidson '76, Marilyn Follmer, Vicki Juneman '76, Carol A. Mahoney ‘75, Melinda Martin, Dee Moore ‘80, Sandy Oliverez, Vicki Slikkerveer, (Republic of Ireland) Eileen Stephens '76, Charlotte Welty (Co-Capt.), Kathy Wright '74, Karen Zakreski ‘76
1975–76	Jean Davenport	8-7	SCWIAC	Unknown	Terri Fischer, Linda Hertz, Patty Howell '78, Vicki Juneman '76, Sandy K. Mars LoPiccolo '83, Dee Moore '80, Sandy Oliverez, Karen Sherman '78, Vicki Slikkerveer, Urszula Tarnowski '78, Bobbie Twydell '81, Karen Zakreski '76
1976–77	Jan Billings '75	Unknown	WCAA	5TH/5	Beverly Backer '79, Jodi Foster (Capt.), Linda Hertz, Patty Howell '78, Vicki Juneman '76, Carolyn Knight '81, Ellen Linderman '81, Sandy K. Mars LoPiccolo '83, Kim Mark '79, Dee Moore '80, Sandy Oliverez, Karen Sherman '78, Vicki Slikkerveer, Urszula Tarnowski '78, Bobbie Twydell '81
1977–78	Jan Billings '75	14-14	WCAA	7TH/9	Beverly Backer '79, Patty Howell '78, Carolyn Knight '81, Ellen Linderman '81, Kim Mark '79, Dee Moore '80, Sandy Oliverez, Karen Peterson, Kathy Ricks, Bobbie Twydell '81, Susie Zerbel
1978–79	Jan Billings '75	Unknown	WCAA	5TH/8	Jennifer Fox '82, La Tanya Harris, Ellen Linderman '81, Karen Peterson (Capt.), Kathy Ricks, Colleen Virgino, Fern Quon, Cindy Root, Carolyn Knight '81, Diane Sutton
1979–80	Jan Billings '75	Unknown	WCAA	Unknown	(Philippines) Pia Tamayo, Carol Christian, Irene Corona, Sue Bugalski, Cindy Root, Carol Sawa '80, Denise Sutton, Carolyn Knight '81(Capt.), Margaret Osmond '84, Fern Quon, Paula Dolberg '84, Deanna Rowan, Jamie Schultz
1980–81	Jan Billings '75/ Asst. Sue Marta	9–24	WCAA	Unknown	Carol Christian (Capt.), Sherrie Shellhammer, Paula Dolberg '84, Rose Kalabsa '86, Margaret Osmond '84, Deanna Rowan, Carol Sawa, Joan Warnisher
1981–82	Jan Billings-Kernen '75/ Asst. Shelly Rayburn	7–22	WCAA	2–7	Kristi Blankenship '86, Deanna Rowan, Anita Salas '86, Sherrie Shellhammer, Sue Bugalski '84, Paula Dolberg '84, Rose Kalabsa '86, Margaret Osmond '84(Capt.)
1982–83	Bill Cole '87 MS	5–23	WCAA	5–23	Kristi Blankenship '86(Capt.), Sue Bugalski '84, Paula Dolberg '84, Rose Kalabsa '86(Capt.), Anita Salas '86
1983–84	Bill Etchegaray	8–24	WCAA	Unknown/8TH	Kristi Blankenship '86(Capt.), Sue Bugalski '84, Paula Dolberg '84, Rose Kalabsa '86, Lisa Naso '86, Karen Osterkamp '85, Anita Salas '86
1984–85	Bill Etchegaray	9–20	PacWest	8TH	Kristi Blankenship '86(Co-Capt.), Lydia Davis, Michelle LeFebvre, Debbie Lush, Anita Salas '86(Co-Capt.), Andrea Miller, Debra Reichman '89, Rebecca M. Roman '89, Lindsey Wingert
1985–86	Brad Allen	6–20	PCAA	8TH	Jennifer Aafedt '90, Renata Arnold, Jennifer Berns, Diane Grier, Stacey Hacker, Debbie Lush, Andrea Miller, Kelly Negrete '90, Allison Phelps '88, Debra Reichman '89, Angie Ruden '87
1986–87	Brad Allen	14–12	PCAA	0-8/10TH	Jennifer Aafedt '90(Capt.), Laurie Brown '89, Colleen Duignan '91, Joanne Gratz '90, Anne Kearns '91, Ellen Mault, Andrea Miller, Jeanine Scalero '91, Maureen Zapf '89
1987–88	Brad Allen	15–11	PCAA	2-6/8TH	Jennifer Aafedt '90, Nicole Brechtbuhl '90, Laurie Brown '89, Colleen Duignan '91, Bobbie Griffeth, (Canada) Lanna Hollo, Grace McCourt, Kelli Moore '91, Caroline Sporer '95
1988–89	Brad Allen	13–12	Big West	2-6/8TH	Nicole Brechtbuhl '90, Laurie Brown '89, Colleen Duignan '91, Bobbie Griffeth, (Canada) Lanna Hollo, Grace McCourt, Kelli Moore '91, Grace Schreuders '89, Caroline Sporer '95
1989–90	Bill Reynolds, Emeritus	14–12	Big West	5-6/8TH	Roseann Alva '94, Nicole Brechtbuhl '90, Colleen Duignan '91, Kim Eastman, Marylou Gomez, Bobbie Griffeth, Natalle Hastings '92, Samantha McCarger, Kelli Moore '91(Capt.), Tracy Spellman, Caroline Sporer '95, Michonne Taylor '94
1990–91	Bill Reynolds, Emeritus	15–13	Big West	4-6/7TH	Roseann Alva '94, Jennifer DiNicola '96, Natalle Hastings '92, Elizabeth Ivey '94, Loraine Lau '95, Kelli Moore '91, Sheri Pak '95, Tracy Spellman, Caroline Sporer '95
1991–92	Bill Reynolds, Emeritus	0–21	Big West	0-8/T-7TH	Roseann Alva '94, Kultida Chavtavipat, Danielle Chheng, Natalle Hastings '92, Loraine Lau '95, Anne Marchal '93, Marni Matsumato '94, Kelli Moore, Maile Nakamura, Wendy Seltzer, Robin Szidak, Erika Villaraza
1992–93	Bill Reynolds, Emeritus	7–22	Big West	2-4/8TH	Roseann Alva '94, Christa Hanson '96, Kara Kolb '97, Kelly Krajacic, Christi Le '98, Helen Lu '95, Lorraine Lau '95, Anne Marchal '93, Marni Matsumoto '94, Akemi Smith '93, Robin Szidak '97, Patty Varsos
1993–94	Bill Reynolds, Emeritus	9–18	Big West	1-3/9TH	Suzie Baker '99, Jennifer Canfield '98, Debbie Denio, Mandy Gomez, Christa Hanson '96, Kara Kolb '97, Robin Szidak '97, Patty Varsos
1994–95	Bill Reynolds, Emeritus	11–9	Big West	Unknown/7TH	Suzie Baker '99, Jennifer Canfield 98, Debbie Denio, Christa Hanson '96, Renee Ivy, Katie Kelso, Nicole Kilian '98, Kara Kolb '97, Elizabeth Larson '99, Stephanie Roberts, Nadine Velastegui '98
1995–96	Bill Reynolds, Emeritus	9–15	Big West	1-1/8TH	Alejandra Arredondo '00, Suzie Baker '99, Jennifer Canfield 98, Debbie Denio, Lynnette Herrera '98, Nicole Kilian '98, Kara Kolb '97, Elizabeth Larson '99, Stephanie Roberts, Denise Wilson '97
1996–97	Bill Reynolds, Emeritus	7–15	Big West	1-4/Unknown	Alejandra Arredondo '00, Jennifer Canfield '98, Lynnette Herrera '98, Mandy Hubanks '99, Brooke Lacey '01, Elizabeth Larson '99, Laurel McLatcher '01, Amy Medlin '03, Stephanie Roberts, Ann-Marie Roseen '00, Poornima Swaminathan '00, Hanh Tran, Debbie Vonusa '98, Debbie Wartian '99, Denise Wilson '97
1997–98	Bill Reynolds, Emeritus	11–14	Big West	1-2/6TH	Alejandra Arredondo '00, Helen Jasin, Brooke Lacey '01, Elizabeth Larson '99, Laurel McLatcher '01, Shawna McSheehy, Eleanor Luzano '02, Amy Medlin '03, Amanda Mroz '01, Poornima Swaminathan '00, Summer Tantee, Debbie Vonusa '98, Marcella Walsh '05
1998–99	Bill Reynolds, Emeritus	10–12	Big West	2-4/T-5TH	Michelle Arndt '03, Alexandra Kazarian '03, Brooke Lacey '01, Eleanor Luzano '02, Trisha Marino '01, Laurel McLatcher '01, Amy Medlin '03, Amanda Mroz '01, Nadia Naffa '00, Poornima Swaminathan '00, Summer Tantee
1999-00	Bill Reynolds, Emeritus	6–17	Big West	Unknown/T-9TH	Michelle Arndt '03, Sarah Bornum, Lauren Griffith, Eleanor Luzano '02, Jessica Martin '03, Laurel McLatcher '01, Amy Medlin '03, Damara Nasca '04, Amanda Oldridge '08, Trisha Steelman, Poornima Swaminathan '00
2000–01	Bill Reynolds, Emeritus	5–18	Big West	0-6/9TH	Michelle Arndt '03, Joanna Cruz, Lauren Griffith, Adriana Hockicko '06, (Romania) Ana Maria Iacob '06, Eleanor Luzano '02, Jessica Martin '03, Shirley Mejia, (Romania) Ioana Sisoe '06
2001–02	Bill Reynolds, Emeritus	7–15	Big West	1-5/T-9TH	Michelle Arndt '03(Capt.), Joanna Cruz, Caroline Freeman '06, Adriana Hockicko '06, Heather Hohenstein '07, (Romania) Ana Maria Iacob '06, Mayra Mariscal, Jessica Martin '03, Dora Prado, Carla Rocha '05, (Romania) Ioana Sisoe '06
2002–03	Bill Reynolds, Emeritus, Asst. Michelle Arndt '03	3–20	Big West	0-9/T-9TH	Ashley Dunbar '06, Caroline Freeman '06, Adriana Hockicko '06, (Romania) Ana Maria Iacob '06, (Turkey) Ruya Inalpulat '07, Nicole Labrucherie, Jessica Martin '03, Brittany Minna, Carla Rocha '05, (Romania) Ioana Sisoe '06
2003–04	Bill Reynolds, Emeritus, Asst. Michelle Arndt '03	12–11	Big West	1-6/9TH	Nicole Arias '06, Ashley Dunbar '06, Christie Dy, Caroline Freeman '06, (Turkey) Ruya Inalpulat '07, Gina Le '07, Carla Rocha '05, (Romania) Ioana Sisoe '06, Suwalai Teeralarpsuwan '08, Mal-Ly Tran '07
2004–05	Bill Reynolds, Emeritus, Asst. Michelle Arndt '03	7–14	Big West	1-7/9TH	Nicole Arias '06, Ashley Dunbar '06, Carla Dyquiangco, Jessica Ewing '09, Caroline Freeman '06, (Turkey) Ruya Inalpulat '07, Gina Le '07, Carla Rocha '05, Ioana Sisoe '06, Mal-Ly Tran '07
2005–06	Bill Reynolds, Emeritus Asst. (South Korea) Mr. Hung Soon Park	5–16	Big West	1-6/7TH	Ashley Dunbar '06(Capt.), (Turkey) Ruya Inalpulat '07, Cheyenne Inglis '10, Shelly Injejikian '10, Katy Jeisma, Gina Le '07, Mal-Ly Tran '07, Jessica Winkler
2006–07	Bill Reynolds, Emeritus, Asst. (Turkey) Ruya Inalpulat '07	5–16	Big West	1-6/7TH	Lani Agsalud '11, Brandy Andrews '10, Kristy Aronstam, Jerusha Cruz '10, Katrina Domela '08, Cheyenne Inglis '10, Shelly Injejikian '10, Gina Le '07(Co-Capt.), Ashley Litchfield, Breanna Stowell '08, Mal-Ly Tran '07(Co-Capt.)
2007–08	Bill Reynolds, Emeritus, Asst. (Turkey) Ruya Inalpulat '07	2–19	Big West	0-8/9TH	Lani Agsalud '11, Karina Akhmedova '12, Brandy Andrews '10, Jerusha Cruz '10, Kathleen Doran '10, Cheyenne Inglis '10, Shelly Injejikian '10, Ashley Litchfield, Breanna Stowell '08, Erin Wiesener '11
2008–09	Bill Reynolds, Emeritus, Asst. (Turkey) Ruya Inalpulat '07	3–20	Big West	0-8/9TH	Lani Agsalud '11, Karina Akhmedova '12, Brandy Andrews '10, Leslie Bullock, Fidelia Castillo '12, Jerusha Cruz '10, Kathleen Doran '10, Cheyenne Inglis '10, Shelly Injejikian '10, Erin Wiesener '11
2009–10	Bill Reynolds, Emeritus, Asst. (Turkey) Ruya Inalpulat '07	4–16	Big West	1-7/8TH	Lani Agsalud '11, Karina Akhmedova '12, Carla Arce, Leslie Bullock, Fidelia Castillo '12, Jerusha Cruz '10, Malorie Dela Cruz '13, Tiffany Mai '14(Capt.), Monica Rodriguez '13, Erin Wiesener '11
2010–11	Bill Reynolds, Emeritus, Asst. (Turkey) Ruya Inalpulat '07	7–17	Big West	1-7/8TH	Karina Akhmedova '12, Leslie Bullock, Malorie Dela Cruz '13, Tiffany Mai '14(Capt.), Morgan McIntosh '14, Katie Nichols '13, Monica Rodriguez '13, Megan Sanford, Summer Wallin '12
2011–12	Bill Reynolds, Emeritus, Asst. Chico Bonner	8–13	Big West	1-7/8TH	Devyn Billingsley '16, Malorie Dela Cruz '13, Tiffany Mai '14(Capt.), Morgan McIntosh '14, Jessica Pepa '15, Monica Rodriguez '13, Megan Sanford, Kalika Slevcove '15, Avriel Tomaiko '13
2012–13	Bill Reynolds, Emeritus, Asst. Chico Bonner	11–14	Big West	4-5/T-4TH	Devyn Billingsley '16, Emilia Borkowski, Malorie Dela Cruz '13, Rebekkah Ermac, Tiffany Mai '14(Capt.), Morgan McIntosh '14, Rebekah Penner '14, Jessica Pepa '15, Megan Sanford, Kalika Slevcove '15, Monica Rodriguez '13
2013–14	Dianne Matias/Asst. Mai-Ly Tran '07	8–15	Big West	1-7/8TH	Melanie Abella '15, Devyn Billingsley '16, Emilia Borkowski, Camille De Leon '17, Rebekkah Ermac, Christina Georgescu, Morgan McIntosh '14(Capt.), Rebekah Penner '14, Jessica Pepa '15, Megan Sanford, Kalika Slevcove '15, Alexis Valenzuela '17
2014–15	Dianne Matias/Asst. Mai-Ly Tran '07/ Vol. Asst. Careen Seenauth	10–12	Big West	2-6/7TH	Devyn Billingsley '16, Emilia Borkowski, Camille De Leon '17, Isabel Donaldson (RS) '18, (South Africa) Michelle Erasmus, Rebekkah Ermac, Jessica Pepa '15, Danielle Pham '18, Megan Sandford (Capt.), Kalika Slevcove '15, Alexis Valenzuela '17
2015–16	Dianne Matias/Asst. Mai-Ly Tran '07/ Vol. Asst. Desiree Tran	17–6	Big West	6-2/3rd	Camille De Leon '17(Co-Capt.), Isabel Donaldson '18, Carolen Fararji, (Japan) Masako Makiba '19, Sarah Nuno '19, Danielle Pham '18, (Dominican Republic) Karla Portalatin '19, Alexis Valenzuela '17(Co-Capt.)
2016–17	Dianne Matias/ Asst. Ellie Edles/ Vol. Asst. JR Sarmiento	19-4	Big West	5-3/4TH	Camille De Leon '17(Co-Capt.), Isabel Donaldson '18, Carolen Fararji, (Japan) Masako Makiba '19, (China) Luxizi Meng '19, Sarah Nuno '19, Danielle Pham '18, (Dominican Republic) Karla Portalatin '19, Alexis Valenzuela '17(Co-Capt.)
2017–18	Dianne Matias/ Asst. Ellie Edles/ Vol. Asst. Alexis Valenzuela '17	20-6	Big West	8-3/2nd	Jadie Acidera '21, Isabel Donaldson '18, Caisey Lee Emery '19, Tiani Jadulang, (Japan) Masako Makiba '19, (China) Luxizi Meng '19, Sarah Nuno '19, Danielle Pham '18(Co-Capt.), (Dominican Republic) Karla Portalatin '19(Co-Capt.), Taylor Valenzuela '21, (Taiwan) Genevieve Zeidan '21
2018–19	Dianne Matias/ Asst. Joslynn Burkett/ Vol. Asst. Anna Zarembski	15-6	Big West	7-3/2nd	Jadie Acidera '21, Caisey Lee Emery '19, Tiani Jadulang, (Japan) Masako Makiba '19, (China) Luxizi Meng '19, Sarah Nuno '19(Capt.), (Dominican Republic) Karla Portalatin '19, (Hungary) Petra Such '20, (Sweden) Eira Tobrand '22, Taylor Valenzuela '21, (Taiwan) Genevieve Zeidan '21
2019-20	Dianne Matias/ Asst. Joslynn Burkett/ Vol. Asst. Anna Zarembski	7-5	Big West	0-1/(Season Canceled Early)	Jadie Acidera '21, (Portugal) Camila Garcia '23, (Japan) Misaki Kobayashi, (Hungary) Petra Such '20, (Korea) YuSeung Suh '22, (Sweden) Eira Tobrand '22, Taylor Valenzuela '21, (Taiwan) Genevieve Zeidan '21
2020-21	Dianne Matias/ Asst. Mark Spearman/ Vol. Asst. Luxizi Meng '19	13-6	Big West	6-2/2nd	Jadie Acidera '21, (France) Juliette Daries, Natalie Duffy '24, (Portugal) Camila Garcia '23, (Japan) Misaki Kobayashi, (Korea) YuSeung Suh '22, (Sweden) Eria Tobrand '22, Taylor Valenzuela '21, (Taiwan) Genevieve Zeidan '21
2021-22	Ellie Edles-Williams/ Asst. Alexis Valenzuela '17/ Vol. Asst. Mike Edles	16-8	Big West	5-4/4th	(France) Juliette Daries, Natalie Duffy '24, (Portugal) Camila Garcia '23, Indya Nespor, (Ukraine) Mariia Nikitash '25, (Korea) YuSeung Suh '22(Co-Capt.), Kaytlin Taylor '25, (Sweden) Eria Tobrand '22(Co-Capt.)
2022-23	Trang Huynh-McClain/ Asst. Preeti Gokhale/ Vol. Asst. Quod Tran/ Student-Manager Kenyael Cooper	15-8	Big West	6-3	(France) Juliette Daries, Natalie Duffy '24, (Portugal) Camila Garcia '23, (Armenia) Milena Gevorgyan '25, (Ukraine) Maria Nikitash '25, Zoe Olmos, Megan Tagaloa, Kaytlin Taylor '25, (Russia) Diana Yanotovskaya
2023-24	Trang Huynh-McClain/ Asst. Coach Quoc Tran/ Vol. Asst. Preeti Gokhale/ Student-Manager Kenyael Cooper	17-9	Big West	5-4/6th/2nd Place in Conf. Tourn./Finalist's	Natalie Duffy '24(Capt.), (Armenia) Milena Gevorgyan '25, Audrey Large, (South Korea) Sein Myoung, (Ukraine) Mariia Nikitash '25, Kaytlin Taylor '25, (Canada) Josie Usereau, (Russia) Diana Yanotovskaya, (South Korea) Seha Yu
2024-25	Ellie Johnson/ Asst. Coach Patrick Tierro/ Student-Manager Kenyael Cooper	10-10	Big West	4-5/7th	(Armenia) Milena Gevorgyan '25, Carrington Hayes, Dana Kunza, (Switzerland) Emilie Lugon-Moulin (RS), (South Korea) Sein Myoung, (Ukraine) Mariia Nikitash '25(Co-Capt.), Kaytlin Taylor '25(Co-Capt.), (Russia) Diana Yanotovskaya, (South Korea) Seha Yu,
2025-26	Ellie Johnson/ Asst. Coach Patrick Tierro/ Vol. Asst. Coach Kenyael Cooper/ Athletic Trainer Sonia Barrad	14-8	Big West	6-3/3rd	(Armenia) Milena Gevorgyan '25(Co-Capt.), Dana Kunza, (Switzerland) Emilie Lugon-Moulin, (Germany) Martina Markov, (Australia) Chloe Schwarz, (Australia) Madison Schwarz, (South Korea) Seha Yu(Co-Capt.), (Australia) Amelia Zylberman
2026-27	Ellie Johnson/ Asst. Coach Patrick Tierro/ Vol. Asst. Coach Kenyael Cooper		Big West		(Austria) Johanna Hiesmair, Dana Kunza, (Sweden) Stina Larsson, (Switzerland) Emilie Lugon-Moulin, (Germany) Martina Markov, (Spain) Martina Puvill-Fuertes, (Guatemala) Maria Ramos, Leanna Roman, (South Korea) Seha Yu
Yearly Titans Women's Varsity Tennis Results

=== Titans NCAA/Oracle ITA Women's Collegiate Tennis Team Division I National Ranking Historical ratings ===
Month/Day/Year/Season	NCAA Division I Collegiate Tennis National Ranking	Association
3/8/2016 – (2015–16 Season)	#67	Oracle/ITA
6/6/2018 – (2017–18 Season)	#81	Oracle/ITA
3/30/2022 - (2021-22 Season)	#60	Oracle/ITA
3/19/2022 - (2021-22 Season)	#67	Oracle/ITA
4/13/2022 - (2021-22 Season)	#64	Oracle/ITA
4/24/2022 - (2021-22 Season)	#74	Oracle/ITA
5/25/2022 - (2021-22 Season)	#75	Oracle/ITA
NCAA Division I CSUF Titans Women's Collegiate Tennis Team National Rankings Historical Appearances

=== Titans NCAA/Oracle ITA Women's Collegiate Tennis Singles/Doubles Individual Division I National Ranking Historical ratings ===
Month/Day/Year/Season	NCAA Division I Collegiate Tennis Singles National Ranking	NCAA Division I Collegiate Tennis Doubles National Ranking	Player/Players Name	Association
4/12/2016 – (2015–16 Season)	–	#45 Doubles	Alexis Valenzuela '17 & Camille De Leon '17	Oracle/ITA
4/19/2016 – (2015–16 Season)	–	#55 Doubles	Alexis Valenzuela '17 & Camille De Leon '17	Oracle/ITA
6/2/2016 – (2015–16 Season-end)	–	#56 Doubles	Alexis Valenzuela '17 & Camille De Leon '17	Oracle/ITA
9/13/2016 – (Preseason 2016–17)	-	#31 Doubles	Alexis Valenzuela '17 & Camille De Leon '17	Oracle/ITA
4/11/2017 – (2015–17 Season)	-	#78 Doubles	Alexis Valenzuela '17 & Camille De Leon '17	Oracle/ITA
4/18/2017 – (2016–17 Season)	-	#51 Doubles	Alexis Valenzuela '17 & Camille De Leon '17	Oracle/ITA
4/25/2017 – (2016–17 Season)	-	#58 Doubles	Alexis Valenzuela '17 & Camille De Leon '17	Oracle/ITA
5/4/2017 – (2016–17 Season)	-	#62 Doubles	Alexis Valenzuela '17 & Camille De Leon '17	Oracle/ITA
5/31/2017 – (2016–17 Season)	-	#80 Doubles	Alexis Valenzuela '17 & Camille De Leon '17	Oracle/ITA
11/15/2017 – (Preseason 2017–18)	#103 Singles	-	(Taiwan) Genevieve Zeidan	Oracle/ITA
2/7/2018 – (2017–18 Season)	#97 Singles	-	(Taiwan) Genevieve Zeidan	Oracle/ITA
2/20/2018 – (2017–18 Season)	#103 Singles	-	(Taiwan) Genevieve Zeidan	Oracle/ITA
3/20/2018 – (2017–18 Season)	#125 Singles	-	(Taiwan) Genevieve Zeidan	Oracle/ITA
4/10/2018 – (2017–18 Season)	#114 Singles	-	(Taiwan) Genevieve Zeidan	Oracle/ITA
9/11/2018 – (Preseason 2018–19)	#115 Singles	-	(Taiwan) Genevieve Zeidan	Oracle/ITA
NCAA Division I CSUF Titans Women's Collegiate Tennis Singles/Doubles National Rankings Historical Appearances

== Men's team results ==
=== Discontinued Titans Men's Varsity Tennis yearly historical records/standings ===
Year	Coach	Record	Conference	Record/Finish	Roster
1960–61	Dr. Ernest Becker, Emeritus	Unknown	Independent Div.	Unknown	Tom Bonnema '61, Bill Bogdanoff '64, Jon Brettman '63, Charles Chapman '62, Don Dannenbring '63, Mike Fendersen, Ernie Lopez '64, George Rentfro '62, Chuck Rogers, Ken Smith Jr. '63, David Sprague, Neale R. Stoner '62(Capt.), Jim Wicker '63, Ted Zitlau '63
1961–62	Dr. Ernest Becker, Emeritus	Unknown	Independent Div.	Unknown	Jim Blondin '63, Jack Clement '63, Tom Cottle, Tony Keeling, Ernie Lopez '64, George Rentfro '62, John Roberts, Mitchel Saadi '64(Capt.), Dennis Silver '63, Ken Smith Jr. '63, Ben Wade '63, Jim Wicker '63
1962–63	Thomas J. Ashley/Neale R. Stoner '62	6-6	NAIA	Unknown	Jim Blondin '63, Mike Bouck, Jack Clement '63, Tom Cottle, Tony Keeling, Rosalie Passovoy '63, John Roberts, Mitchel Saadi '64, Dennis Silver '63, Ken Smith Jr. '63, Neil Stenton '64, Ben Wade '63
1963–64	Neale R. Stoner '62	Unknown	NAIA	Unknown	Bill Bogdanoff '64, Mike Bouck (Co-Capt.), Steve Cogswell, Fred Engesser '67, Vic Hoong, Stan Kula '67(Co-Capt.), Rocky Myers, Rich Robinson, Gary Smith, Neil Stenton '64, Vern Stuart, Mr. Weyand, Don Wilde
1964–65	Stan Kula '67	4–7	Ind./Col. Dist. III	4–7	Tom Bailey, Dan Baldwin, Rod Bolton '67, Jim Coen '66, Lyle Jordan '91, Jose Nino '68, Les Spralding, Mike Stone '67, Jim Vogt
1965–66	Mark Kabacy	7–13	Ind./Col. Dist. III	7–13	Donald Alger '68, Rod Bolton '67, Jim Coen '66(Capt.), Richard Drake '66, Gregory Garza '71, John Mulligan '71, Jose Nino '68, Dave Utley '68, Steve White '68, Jon Wilson
1966–67	Dr. Michael Yessis, Emeritus	4–13	CCAA (Div. II)	Unknown	Donald Alger '68, Don Kortangen '74, Gray Nesbit '70, Jose Nino '68, Lee Starke '68, Terry Trabant '68, Steve White '68
1967–68	Dr. Michael Yessis, Emeritus	4–15	CCAA (Div. II)	0-7/8TH	Donald Alger '68, Terry L. Badger '73, David Clark '68, Steve Horton '72, Don Kortangen '74, Rich Lind '70, George Medrano '72, Gray Nesbit '70, John Nevin Jr. '70, Jose Nino '68, Russ Siegel '71, Lee Starke '68, Steve White '68
1968–69	Dr. Michael Yessis, Emeritus	5-15	CCAA (Div. II)	Unknown	Kirk Anderson, Terry L. Badger '73, Dale Carey '71, Ellery Ehrlich '69, Ron Filbert '69, Steve Horton '72, Rich Lind '70, John Nevin Jr. '70, Jeff Powell '72, Greg Smith '71, Wayne Spangler '70
1969–70	Steve White '68	9-11	CCAA (Div. II)	1-7	Terry L. Badger '73, James Ball '71, Ray Barnum '72, Dale Carey '71, Dave Clark '73, Jim Clegern '72, Tim Draxler '73, Dale Gelgur, Dale LaRock, Gray Nesbit '70, Greg Smith, Mike Sweeney '73, Bruce Westforth
1970–71	Bob Osborn	15–12	CCAA (Div. II)	0–10	Ray Barnum '72(Capt.), Chuck Brauer '73, Dale Carey '71, Jim Clegern '72, Rick Doebler '74, Tim Draxler '73, Dale Gelgur, Tom Phillips '75, Tim Reed, Alan Schneider '73, Bob Silverman, Mike Sweeney '73, Ron Waldron '74, Bruce Westforth
1971–72	Craig Neslage '74 MBA	14-7	CCAA (Div. II)	6-6/3RD	Bob Backes, Chuck Brauer '73, Rick Doebler '74, Alan Foster, Dale Gelgur, Ron Metcalf '76, Tim Reed, Mark Sigman '74, Mike Sweeney '73, Jon Walters '76, Bruce Westforth (Capt.)
1972–73	Craig Neslage '74 MBA	17-10	CCAA (Div. II)	3RD	Wayne Church '75, Rick Doebler '74, Alan Foster (Capt.), Dale Gelgur, Bryan McDougal '75, Ron Metcalf '76, (Mexico) Oscar Meyer, Steve Miller '76, Dave Sallee, Dan Shoda, Larry Taylor, Jon Walters '76
1973–74	Craig Neslage '74 MBA	11-12	CCAA (Div. II)	Unknown	Wayne Church '75, Rick Doebler '74(Capt.), Pete Fischer '79, Mark Hamilton, Craig Henderson '76, Gregg Henderson, Jon Hosea '75, Bryan McDougal '75, Paul McWherter, Ron Metcalf '76, (Mexico) Oscar Meyer, Dan Shoda, Greg Smith '75, Duane Stotland '75, Mark Tendal '76, Jon Walters '76
1974–75	Steve Warfield/Ron Witchey, Emeritus	Unknown	PCAA (Div. I)	4TH	Allan Bridgford, Larry Campbell, Keith Christman '78, Pete Fischer '79, Gregg Henderson, Jon Hosea '75, Bryan McDougal '75, Miguel A. Pulido '80, Gary Quandt '75(Capt.), Greg Smith '75, Duane Stotland '75
1975–76	Ron Witchey, Emeritus/ Asst. Jon Walters '76/ Asst. Jim Haley	22-7	PCAA (Div. I)	7-0/3RD	Phil Beilin, Rick Benedict, Keith Christman '78, Kelly Davidson '77, Gil Duran '79, Mike Duran, Ron Ferguson '79, Pete Fischer '79, Bryan Fitzpatrick '78, Jay S. Gulyas '77, Gregg Henderson, Tom Jensen '79, Gary Keefe, Miguel A. Pulido '80, Marc Roy '81, Rudy Ybarra '79
1976–77	Ron Witchey, Emeritus/Asst. John Nordstrom '78/ Asst. Jay S. Gulyas '77	25-7	PCAA (Div. I)	7-0/2ND	Phil Beilin, Bill Carpenter '81, Keith Christman '78, Kelly Davidson '77, Jeff Dehart, Gil Duran '79, Mike Duran, Pete Fischer '79, Bob Goldstein, Gregg Henderson, Steve Langston, Dave Lind '80, Dave Nicholson, Miguel A. Pulido '80, Mike Tunstall, Rudy Ybarra '79
1977–78	Ron Witchey, Emeritus/Asst. John Nordstrom '78/Team Manager Allan Cox	24-8	PCAA (Div. I)	7TH	Bill Bereczky '81, Mike Capelouto, Bill Carpenter '81, Keith Christman '78, Mike Chwalek '81, Arnie Darini, Alan Fischer, Bob Goldstein, Tom Hannah, Steve Langston, (Mexico) Guido Lorandi, Brian Platt '80, Miguel A. Pulido '80, Dave Nicholson, (Sweden) Bjorn Johansson
1978–79	Ron Witchey, Emeritus	15-12	PCAA (Div. I)	5TH	Jamie Ashton, Dave Barrows '81, Bill Carpenter '81, Mike Chwalek '81(Capt.), Frank Ellis (RS) '83, John Edwards, Randy Friend '83, Tom Hannah, Matt Harris '81, Dave Junso '82, Todd Meyer, Brian Platt '80, (Netherlands) Paul Roetert '80, Paul Shaver
1979–80	Paul K. Miller, Emeritus/Asst. Jim Worth	12-18	PCAA (Div. I)	7TH	Dave Barrows '81(Capt.), Bill Carpenter '81, Paul Di Giulio, Perry Di Giulio, John Edwards, Frank Ellis '83, Randy Friend '83, Tim Giller, John Hammargren '83, Matt Harris '81, Michael Moore '84, (Netherlands) Paul Roetert '80, Paul Shaver
1980–81	Jan Billings '75/Asst. Dave Barrows '81	6-26	PCAA (Div. I)	8TH	Bill Carpenter '81, John Edwards, (Iran) Braham Eftekhari '84, Frank Ellis '83, Mark Friend '85, Randy Friend '83(Capt.), John Hammargren '83, Michael Moore '84
1981–82	Jan Billings-Kernen '75/Asst. Ed Burt	Unknown	PCAA (Div. I)	8TH	John Edwards, (Iran) Braham Eftekhari '84, Frank Ellis '83, Mark Friend '85, Randy Friend '83(Capt.), Tom Jones, Todd Kreter '82, Michael Moore '84
1982–83	Ed Burt	19-20	PCAA (Div. I)	7TH	Brad Cotten '84, (Iran) Braham Eftekhari '84, Frank Ellis '83, (England) Julian Lowin '85, Tim Macres, Michael Moore '84, Phil Moser, William Schuster '85, Donny Young
1983–84	Ed Burt	Unknown	PCAA (Div. I)	8TH	(Iran) Braham Eftekhari '84, Everette Brunelle, Scott Dunn '87, Bob Grau '86, (England) Julian Lowin '85, Tim Macres, (South Africa) Craig McSmythe, Michael Moore '84, David Pratt, William Schuster '85, Donny Young
1984–85	Buff Bogard/Eric Sherbeck	9–36	PCAA (Div. I)	10TH	Bob Anderson, Bryan Barone, Fausto Bucheli '87, Mike Gagnon '90, Steve Holland, Kevin Joe '88, Robert Mayson '88, Joel Milazzo '88
1985–86	Mike Muscare	4–14	PCAA (Div. I)	10TH	Billy Andrews, Bryan Barone, (Morocco) Driss Benomar '88, Fausto Bucheli '87(Capt.), Wayne Dennen '88, Mike Gagnon '90, Kevin Joe '88, Ron Johnson '89, Thomas Leffler, Robert Leiter '88, Matt Negle, Paul Treinen '90
1986–87	Mike Muscare/Asst. Richie Siegel	15–11	PCAA (Div. I)	8TH	(Morocco) Driss Benomar '88, Chris Cabral, Eric Dishington, Mike Gagnon '90, Markus Hillman, Kevin Joe '88, Robert Leiter '88, Ron Johnson '89, Stephen Joyner, Paul Treinen '90, (India) Sanjeev Khanna '91
Discontinued Yearly Titans Men's Varsity Tennis Program Historical Results

== Venue ==
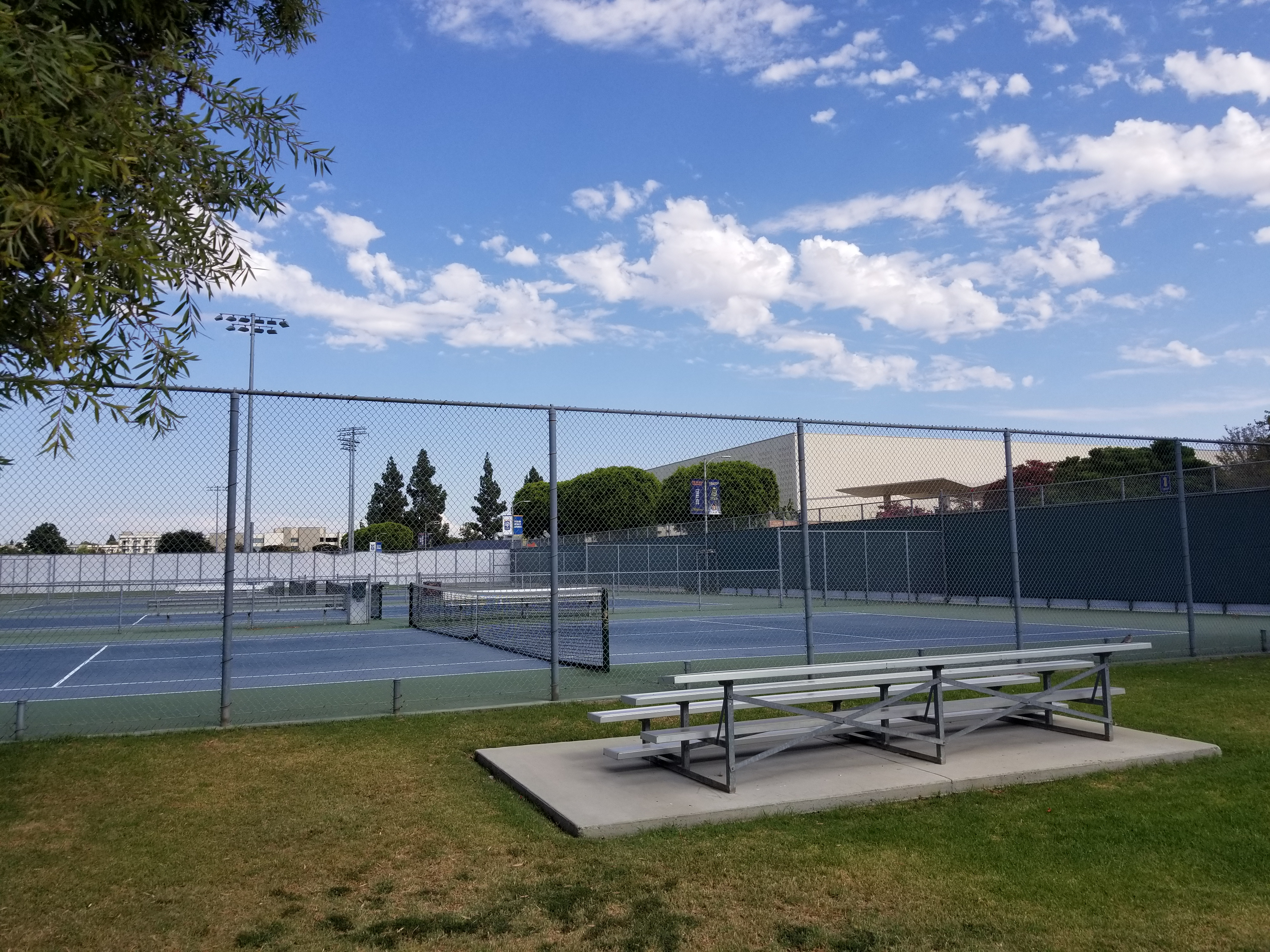
Titan Courts

== Titan tennis military veteran members ==
- Coach Thomas Jess Ashley, United States Marine Corps (USMC)
- Coach Dr. Ernest A. Becker, United States Navy (USN)
- Jim Blondin '63, United States Marine Corps (USMC), 1955–63
- Jon Brettmann '63, United States Army (USA), 1956–64
- Don Dannenbring '63, United States Army (USA)
- Richard Drake '66, '71, United States Army (USA), 1960-62 & 1980-2001
- Tim Draxler '73, United States Marine Corps (USMC), Vietnam Veteran 1966-69
- Gil Duran '79, United States Navy Reserve (USNR), 1987-07
- Mike Duran, United States Air Force (USAF) 1979-86
- Ellery Ehrlich '69, United States Army (USA), Vietnam Veteran 1970-71
- Lyle Jordan '91, United States Navy (USN)
- Coach Mark Kabacy, United States Air Force (USAF)
- Paul McWherter, United States Army (USA)
- Gray Nesbit '70, United States Navy (USN) 1971-73
- Mitchel Saadi '64, United States Army (USA)
- Mark Sigman '74, United States Navy (USN)
- C. Ken Smith '63, United States Army (USA)
- Neil Stenton '64, United States Army (USA)
- Mike Stone '67, United States Navy (USN) 1967-71
- Coach Neale R. Stoner '62, United States Army (USA)
- Steve White '68, United States Army Reserve (USAR) 1968-72
- Asst. Coach Jim Worth, United States Army (USA)
- Coach Dr. Michael Yessis, United States Army (USA)
