= Ernest Becker (disambiguation) =

Ernest Becker (1924–1974) was an American cultural anthropologist and writer.

Ernest Becker may also refer to:

- Ernest Becker (athletic director) (1914–1998), American tennis player, coach, and college athletics administrator
- Ernest Becker Middle School, Nevada, United States
- Ernie Becker (Canadian football) (1925–2007), Canadian football player
