= Cal State Fullerton Titans =

Sports teams of a university

California State University, Fullerton Titans
- University: California State University, Fullerton
- Nickname: Titans
- NCAA: Division I
- Conference: Big West Conference (primary); Mountain Pacific Sports Federation (men and women's indoor track and field)
- Athletic director: Jim Donovan
- Location: Fullerton, California
- Varsity teams: 18 (8 men's, 10 women's)
- Basketball arena: Titan Gym
- Baseball stadium: Goodwin Field
- Softball stadium: Anderson Family Field
- Soccer stadium: Titan Stadium
- Other venues: Titan Courts; Titan Track Complex
- Colors: Titan Blue and Titan Orange
- Mascot: Tuffy the Titan (Elephant)
- Fight song: For our dear old Fullerton!
- Website: fullertontitans.com

Team NCAA championships
- 6

Individual and relay NCAA champions
- 5

The California State University, Fullerton Titans (also known as CSUF or Fullerton Titans) are the athletic teams that represent California State University, Fullerton.

The Titans are a member of the NCAA Division I level. The Titans compete within the Big West Conference (BWC) for most sports.

== Nickname ==
The California State University, Fullerton official team nickname is the "Titans". The nickname was chosen in a vote by the students.

== History ==
CSUF has won 13 national championships in eight different sports.

== Sports sponsored ==
Men's sports	Women's sports
Baseball	Basketball
Basketball	Cross country
Cross country	Golf
Golf	Soccer
Soccer	Softball
Track and field^{1}	Tennis
Water Polo	Track and field^{1}
	Volleyball
	Water Polo
^{1} – includes both indoor and outdoor.

=== Baseball ===
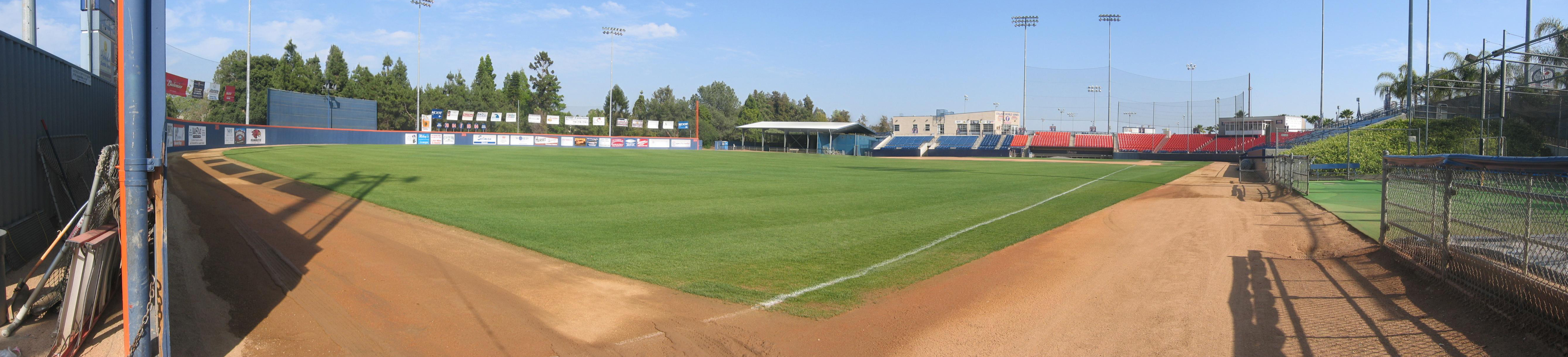
Goodwin Field, home to CSUF Titan's baseball team

Baseball is Cal State Fullerton's strongest sport based on winning the most national championships at the university and consistently being rated among the nation's elite baseball programs. They have won four national championships in the NCAA Men's Baseball College World Series since 1979: 1979, 1984, 1995, and 2004.

Fullerton home games are played at on-campus Goodwin Field, and the team is currently coached by Rick Vanderhook.

=== Basketball ===
==== Men's basketball ====
Big West logo in Cal State Fullerton's colors

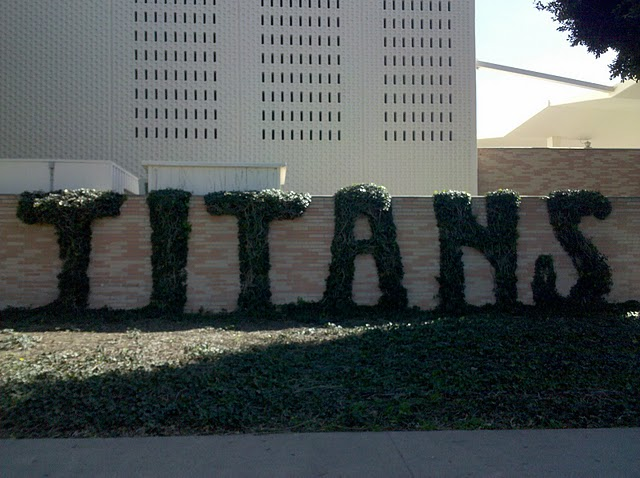
A topiary on the north side of Titan Gym

The Cal State Fullerton men's basketball team competes in the Big West Conference and has been led by head basketball coach Dedrique Taylor since the 2013–14 season. The team plays at Titan Gym.

The Titans men's basketball team has appeared in four NCAA Division I men's basketball tournaments in 1978, 2008, 2018, and 2022. Their combined record is 2–4.

The men's team has also played in three National Invitation Tournaments in 1983, 1997 and 2005.

==== Women's basketball ====
The Cal State Fullerton women's basketball team competes in the Big West Conference and plays at Titan Gym.

The team began play during the 1969–70 season under head coach, Billie Moore. During that season, the Titans were invited to the national tournament sponsored by the CIAW (a predecessor to the AIAW.) The Titans defeated West Chester to win the women's national championship 50–46 in their first year of existence.

=== Cross country ===
Head Coach John Elders has directed the men's and women's cross country programs since 1988.

==== Men's cross country ====
- 1971 NCAA Division II Championship Team Title
- 1970 NCAA College Division Individual Championship winner – Mark Covert '73
- Seven-Time All-American – Mark Covert '73
- 1992 Individual Big West Champion (8K) – Mike Tansley, Time – 25:53.00
- 1993 Individual Big West Champion (8K) – Mike Tansley, Time – 24:33.00
- 1992 & 1993 Big West Athlete of the Year – Mike Tansley

==== Women's cross country ====
- 1994 All-American Heather Killeen, distance runner
- 2019 Big West Team Champions

=== Women's golf ===
In 1967, Martha Wilkinson won the women's national intercollegiate individual golf championship (an event conducted by the Division of Girls' and Women's Sports, which evolved into the current NCAA women's golf championship).

=== Soccer ===
==== Men's soccer ====
The Titans men's soccer team competes in the Big West Conference and has been coached by George Kuntz since 2014. The team plays at Titan Stadium.

The Titans men's soccer team's first season was in 1965 and the first Head Coach was Dr. Azmy Ibrahim. There were five Head Coaches from 1965 to 1974 before they became a Division I soccer program.

The Cal State Fullerton Titans men's soccer team have an NCAA Division I Tournament appearance of 7–10 through ten appearances.

Year	Round	Opponent	Result
1975	Second Round; Quarterfinals	Colorado College; San Francisco	W 1–0; L 2–3
1986	First Round	UCLA	L 0–3
1993	First Round; Second Round; Third Round; Semifinals	Fresno State; San Diego; San Francisco; South Carolina	W 4–0; W 3–2; W 1–0; L 0–1
1994	First Round; Second Round; Third Round	San Diego; San Francisco; Indiana	W 3–1; W 1–0; L 1–2
1996	First Round; Second Round	UCLA; Creighton	W 2–1; L 0–1
1998	First Round	San Diego	L 1–2
2000	First Round	Stanford	L 0–4
2014	First Round	San Diego	L 1–2
2015	First Round	Santa Clara	L 0–3
2017	First Round	Pacific	L 1–2

Titans on the United States Olympic Men's Soccer squads

- Mike Fox – 1984
- Joe DiGiamarino – 2000
- Brian Dunseth – 2000

==== Women's soccer ====
The Cal State Fullerton women's soccer team competes in the Big West Conference and plays at Titan Stadium.

Demian Brown has been head women's soccer coach since 2007. He has led the team to three Big West Conference championships and was named Big West Conference soccer coach of the Year twice in 2007 and 2012. Brown led the Titans to an NCAA Tournament appearance in 2007 as a first year head coach and again in 2013 after winning the Big West Conference championship.

As a Titans assistant coach, Brown helped the team to two NCAA Tournament appearances. Once in 2005 and a "Sweet 16" tournament berth in 2006. The team also won two Big West Conference championships with Brown as assistant coach.

The Cal State Fullerton Titans women's soccer team have an NCAA Division I Tournament record of 3–7 through seven appearances.

Year	Round	Opponent	Result
2001	First Round	UCLA	L 0–3
2005	First Round; Second Round; Third Round	UNLV; USC; Virginia	W 1–0; W 3–1; L 1–2
2006	First Round; Second Round	Loyola Marymount; UCLA	W 3–0; L 1–3
2007	First Round	UCLA	L 1–3
2013	First Round	Stanford	L 0–1
2014	First Round	Stanford	L 2–5
2015	First Round	USC	L 3–4
2017	First Round	Pepperdine	L 0–1

=== Softball ===
The Cal State Fullerton Titans softball team competes in the Big West Conference and plays at Anderson Family Field. Since 2013, the team has been coached by Kelly Ford.

Titans softball won the 1986 NCAA Division I Softball National Championship. The team has also appeared in eight Women's College World Series, in 1980, 1981, 1982 (NCAA), 1983, 1985, 1986, 1987 and 1995. As of the 2019 season, the Titans have made twenty-five NCAA postseason appearances in their history.

At the 2004 Summer Olympics, "Titans Three-Time All-American", Jenny Topping, won a gold medal as a member of the team in Athens, Greece.

Former head coaches

- Head Coach Judi Garman directed the team from 1980 to 1999 with overall record 913–376–4.
- Head Coach Michelle Gromacki directed the team from 2000 to 2012 and had an overall record of 424–302–1.

=== Women's tennis ===
Head Coach Dianne Matias has been leading the Cal State Fullerton women's tennis program since 2013. She is the fifth women's tennis head coach to lead the program since the 1983 season.

The team has competed in the Big West Conference starting with the 1987 season.

=== Track and field ===
==== Men's track and field ====
Head coach John Elders has directed the Titans men's track program since 1988. Starting in the 2021–22 academic year, Cal State Fullerton began competing in men's indoor track and field in the Mountain Pacific Sports Federation. Previously, only the women's team competed indoors.

Men's outdoor track and field records
Event	Athlete	Time/Distance/Points	Year
100M	Jon Pratter	10.46	2007
200M	Kevin Howard	21.23	1999
400M	Brandon Campbell	46.98	2000
800M	Nate Heggenberger	1:51.42	1997
1500M	Steve Frisone	3:48.98	1994
3000M	Jordan Horn	8:17.13	2007
3000M SC	Mike Tansley	8:41.27	1994
5000M	Jordan Horn	14:06.09	2005
10,000M	Jordan Horn	29:02.57	2007
110m Hurdles	Lamar Jackson	14.34	2007
400m Hurdles	Richard Adams	51.28	2001
4 × 100 m Relay	McCullum F., Williams, Brown, Campbell	40.15	2002
4 × 400 m Relay	Brown, McCullum F., Campbell, Ortega	3:10.46	2002
Long Jump	Brandon Campbell	25'4.5"	2001
Triple Jump	Joe Thomas	51'11.25"	2004
High Jump	Brandon Campbell	7'4.5"	2001
Pole Vault	Giovanni Lanaro	18'4.5"	2004
Shot Put	Don Turri	59'11"	1973
Discus Throw	Fritz Coffman	176'4"	1974
Javelin Throw	Rob Vazquez	228'11.5"	1991
Javelin Throw (Old Table)	Jim Feeney	243'4"	1972
Hammer Throw	Scott Hutchinson	189'9"	2007
Decathlon	Brandon Campbell	6,637 Points	2000
Decathlon (Old Table)	Paul Fink	7,067 Points	1974

Men's imperial distance records
Event	Athlete	Time/Distance/Points	Year
100YDS.	Sam Small	9.6h	1975
220YDS.	Sam Small	21.4h	1975
440YDS.	Steve Wennerstrom	47.1h	1970
880 YDS.	Mike Eck	1:49.2h	1968
One-Miles	Jim Woodward	4:05.9h	1973
Two-Miles	John Casco	8:47.7h	1972
Three-Miles	John Casco & Dave White	13.42.0h	1971/1973
Six Miles	Mark Covert	28:08.3h	1971
Marathon	Doug Schmenk	2:16.33	1972
120 YD. Hurdles	Ed Hill	14.4h	1967
440 YD. Hurdles	Jerry Huss	52.4h	1973
440 YD. Relay	Small, Everage, Lloyd, Tavie	41.2h	1975
880 YD. Relay	Maikisch, Tiscaareno, Titus, ?	1:27.4h	1971
One-Mile Relay	Ankerman, Bryan, Thomas, Lloyd	3:14.6h	1975
Sprint Medley	Eck, Ochoa, Smith, Stratton	3:26.5h	1968
Two-Mile Relay	Love, Tubb, Keane, Payan	7:36.0h	1971
Distance Relay	Wilson, Wooley, Baird, Tubb	9:55.4	1972

==== Women's track and field ====
Head coach John Elders has led the Titans women's track program since 1988.

Women's outdoor track and field records
Event	Athlete	Time/Distance/Points	Year
100M	Ciara Short	11.58	2011
200M	Ciara Short	23.28	2011
400M	Ciara Short	51.85	2011
800M	Lakeysha McClenton	2:09.75	2002
1500M	Mary Kenney	4:28.50	1989
3000M	Mary Kenney	9:43.83	1987
3000M SC	Juliane Masciana	10:15.96	2009
5000M	Carolyn Ellis	16:33.72	2010
10,000M	Grace Gonzales	35:02.16	2008
100m Hurdles	Lauren Williams	13.22	2009
400m Hurdles	Destany Cearley	1:00.51	2006
400m Relay	Short, Williams, Evans, Chang	45.52	2010
1600m Relay	Wilson, Blake, McClellan, Hudson	3:39.18	2007
Long Jump	Anna Doty	19'5 1/4	2002
Triple Jump	Anna Doty	41'5 3/4	2001
High Jump	Loren Gualco	5'7 3/4	1998
Pole Vault	Jennifer Clarke	12'10 1/4	2003
Shot Put	Jameena Hunt	48'10 3/4	2009
Discus Throw	Jameena Hunt	173'9	2009
Javelin Throw	Karen Bardsley	135'4	2007
Hammer Throw	Jameena Hunt	185'1	2010
Heptathlon	Lacey Welborn	4,508 Points	2003
6k XC	Grace Gonzales	20:42.20	2008
5k XC	Grace Gonzales	17:06.10	2008

=== Women's volleyball ===
The Cal State Fullerton women's volleyball team competes in the Big West Conference and has been coached by head women's volleyball coach Ashley Preston since 2015.

During the 2010 season, Fullerton won the conference championship with a record of 26–6. That year, head coach Carolyn Zimmerman won the Big West Conference coach of the year and Erin Saddler won Big West Conference player of the Year. In 2008, Brittany Moore also won the Big West Conference player of the Year.

The Cal State Fullerton Titans women's volleyball team have an NCAA Division I Tournament record of 0–1 through one appearance.

Year	Round	Opponent	Result
2010	First Round	Colorado State	L 2–3

Titans on USA Women's Volleyball rosters

- 2009–10 Brittany Moore, Women's US national team
- 2013 Bre Moreland, USA U23 beach national team

Former head coaches

- Kristi Conklin (1976) (5–10–3)
- Jill Goldberg (1977–79) (24–50)
- Fran Cummings (1980–88) (84–216)
- Jim Huffman (1989–91) (25–80)
- Mary Ellen Murchison (1992–2001) (76–211)
- Carolyn Zimmerman (2002–2014) (162–169)

== Former varsity sports ==
- The fencing Intercollegiate Program for Men and Women was discontinued in 2008 due to budget constraints.
- Football was discontinued in 1992 due to budget constraints.
- Gymnastics and wrestling were both dropped at the same time after the 2010–2011 season due to budget constraints.
- Men's tennis was discontinued after the 1987 season due to budget constraints.

=== Football ===
The CSUF football program, discontinued in 1992, set NCAA Division I-A records for most fumbles (73) in a single season and most fumbles lost (41) in a single season. Several Titans moved on to the NFL, including New York Giants standout Mark Collins. It also produced three Canadian Football League players: Mike Pringle who is the league's all-time leading rusher, Damon Allen, the league's all-time leading passer until October 2011, and Allen Pitts, the league's all-time leading receiver until 2008 when he was passed by Milt Stegall.

=== Men's tennis ===
Cal State Fullerton fielded a men's tennis team from 1960 to 1987.

=== Wrestling ===
Wrestling dates to 1968 at Cal State Fullerton. The Titans never won a team championship but boast 31 conference champions, 12 Div. I and 3 Div. II All-Americans and 87 NCAA Div. I national qualifiers including at least one in each of the last 26 seasons. Titan Wrestling competed in Division I in the PAC-10 conference, as the Big West Conference did not support wrestling. Cal State Fullerton's intercollegiate wrestling program was discontinued after 43 years at the conclusion of the 2010–11 season. The program was given the opportunity to continue operating if it could fund its own annual budget. An action was considered at the end of the 2009–10 season, an extensive fund-raising campaign for the 2010–11 season came up short of the $196,145 cash deposited goal by the Aug. 2 deadline. Two former Titan wrestler's include former UFC Bantamweight Champion T.J. Dillashaw and former Pride/Strikeforce/UFC Champion Dan Henderson.

== Championships ==
=== Appearances ===
The CSU Fullerton Titans competed in the NCAA Tournament across 10 active sports (5 men's and 5 women's) 99 times at the Division I level.

- Baseball (41): 1975, 1976, 1977, 1978, 1979, 1980, 1981, 1982, 1983, 1984, 1987, 1988, 1990, 1992, 1993, 1994, 1995, 1996, 1997, 1998, 1999, 2000, 2001, 2002, 2003, 2004, 2005, 2006, 2007, 2008, 2009, 2010, 2011, 2012, 2013, 2014, 2015, 2016, 2017, 2018, 2023
- Men's basketball (4): 1978, 2008, 2018, 2022
- Women's basketball (2): 1989, 1991
- Men's soccer (10): 1975, 1986, 1993, 1994, 1996, 1998, 2000, 2014, 2015, 2017
- Women's soccer (8): 2001, 2005, 2006, 2007, 2013, 2014, 2017, 2019
- Softball (29): 1982, 1983, 1984, 1985, 1986, 1987, 1988, 1989, 1990, 1991, 1992, 1993, 1994, 1995, 1996, 1999, 2000, 2001, 2002, 2003, 2005, 2006, 2007, 2008, 2009, 2016, 2017, 2018, 2019
- Men's indoor track and field (1): 2003
- Men's outdoor track and field (4): 1994, 2002, 2003, 2004
- Women's outdoor track and field (1): 2011
- Women's volleyball (1): 2010

=== Team ===
The Titans of CSU Fullerton earned 5 NCAA championships at the Division I level.

- Men's (4)
  - Baseball (4): 1979, 1984, 1995, 2004
- Women's (1)
  - Softball (1): 1986

Results

School year	Sport	Opponent	Score
1978–79	Baseball	Arkansas	2–1
1983–84	Baseball	Texas	3–1
1985–86	Softball	Texas A&M	3–0
1994–95	Baseball	USC	11–5
2003–04	Baseball	Texas	3–2

CSU Fullerton won 4 national championships at the NCAA Division II level.

- Men's cross country: 1971
- Men's gymnastics: 1971, 1972, 1974

Below are six national championships that were not bestowed by the NCAA:

- Women's (4)
  - Basketball (AIAW) (1): 1970
  - Fencing (NIWFA) (1): 1974
  - Golf (AIAW) (1): 1967 (individual: Martha Wilkinson)
  - Gymnastics (AIAW) (1): 1979 (Note: Prior to NCAA sponsorship, 1 individual champion)
- Below are two national club team championships:
  - Men's bowling (USBC) (1): 1989
  - Co-ed roller hockey, Div. II (NCRHA) (1): 2014

=== Individual ===
CSU Fullerton had 3 Titans win NCAA individual championships at the Division I level.

NCAA individual championships
Order	School year	Athlete(s)	Sport	Source
1	1975–76	Sam Shaw	Men's gymnastics	
2	1982–83	Julie Goewey	Women's gymnastics	
3	1986–87	Li Xiaoping	Men's gymnastics	

At the NCAA Division II level, CSU Fullerton garnered 12 individual championships.

== Athletic facilities ==
The Sports Complex is a multi-purpose stadium complex created in conjunction with the Fullerton Marriott and the City of Fullerton. The complex includes a dance studio, fencing rooms, an indoor archery range, an outdoor swimming complex, racquetball courts, weight-training facilities and wrestling facilities.

=== Current facilities ===
- Anderson Family Field — softball
- Goodwin Field — baseball
- Titan Courts — Women's tennis
- Titan Gym — Men's and women's basketball, Women's volleyball (non-varsity — Women's gymnastics, Wrestling)
- Titan Stadium — Men's and women's soccer
- Titan Track Complex — Men's and women's track and field

=== Former facilities ===
- Amerige Park (1992) — Baseball
- Anaheim Stadium (1970–1971, 1983) — Football
- Santa Ana Stadium (1971–1975, 1984–1991) — Football
- Falcon Stadium (1976–1979) — Football
- Titan Field (1980–1982) — Football, (1991) — Baseball
- Glover Stadium (1983) — Football
- Titan Stadium (1992) — Football

== Traditions ==
=== Mascot ===
As of 1962, a mascot hadn't been chosen to represent the nickname, "Titans". In what began as a practical joke turned into the “First Intercollegiate Elephant Race in Human History.” The event attracted elephants from universities around the United States and even one from England. To publicize the event, an elephant called "Tuffy the Titan" was used and it began appearing on items around campus. A crowd estimated at over 10,000 turned out for the event in Spring 1962. As a result of hosting the race and with no other mascot, the elephant, "Tuffy the Titan", was adopted as the university mascot.

=== School colors ===
The school colors were chosen as a result of a vote by the student body. The colors chosen were royal blue and white, but the athletic equipment manager at the time of the vote thought orange was appropriate on uniforms for a college then known as Orange County State College. The unofficial color was adopted, but wasn't officially acknowledged by the Athletics Council until 1987. In 1992, a change from royal blue to navy blue was initiated.

== Rivalries ==
Because of the proximity to Long Beach State, the schools are considered rivals. The rivalry is especially heated in baseball with the Long Beach State baseball team also having a competitive college baseball program. This of one of few sports where at least two teams from the Big West Conference frequently make the NCAA national tournament. Fullerton also has an intense rivalry with Big West stablemate UC Irvine; the two schools are the only Division I universities in Orange County.

== Titans Athletic Hall of Fame members ==
Titans Athletic Hall of Fame
Member	Sport	Year inducted
Kurt Suzuki	Baseball	2017
George Horton	Baseball	2017
Kathy Van Wyk	Softball	2017
Tiffany Boyd	Softball	2017
Mel Franks	Sports Information Director	2017
Mark Covert	Cross Country	2015
Paul Folino	Athletics Supporter	2015
Ted Silva	Baseball	2015
Jenny Topping	Softball	2015
Neale Stoner	Athletic Director	2015
Associated Students, Inc.	Athletics Supporter	2015
Bobby Dye	Men's Basketball Head Coach	2013
Mike Fox	Men's Soccer	2013
Carol Johnston	Women's Gymnastics	2013
1995 NCAA national championship Team	Baseball	2013
Bruce Bowen	Men's Basketball	2011
Brent Mayne	Baseball	2011
Lynn Rogers	Women's Gymnastics Head Coach	2011
Susan Lewis-Newton	Softball	2011
Merilyn & Jerry Goodwin	Athletics Supporters	2011
Damon Allen	Football	2009
Connie Clark	Softball	2009
Barbie Myslak-Roetert	Women's Gymnastics	2009
Gene Murphy	Head Football Coach	2009
Dan Boone	Baseball	2009
Mark Collins	Football	2007
Judi Garman	Softball	2007
Heather Killeen-Frisone	Cross Country/Track & Field	2007
Mark Kotsay	Baseball	2007
Phil Nevin	Baseball	2007
Leon Wood	Men's Basketball	2007
Greg Bunch	Men's Basketball	2005
Nancy Dunkle	Women's Basketball	2005
Tami Elliott-Harrison	Women's Gymnastics	2005
Augie Garrido	Baseball	2005
Susan LeFebvre	Softball	2005
Eugenia Miller-Rycraw	Women's Basketball	2005
Tim Wallach	Baseball	2005

== Cal State Fullerton Athletic Directors ==
- Jim Donovan (Dec. 2012–present)
- Dr. Steve Walk (July 2012–Dec. 2012) – Interim
- Brian Quinn (2002–2012)
- John Easterbrook (1994–2001)
- Bill Schumard (1991–1994)
- Ed Carroll (1985–1991)
- Lynn Eilefson (1982–1985)
- Mike Mullally (1979–1981)
- Neale R. Stoner (1972–1979)
- Dr. John Caine (1968–1972)
- Dr. Elmer L. Johnson (1965–1968)
- Ernest Becker (1963–1964)
