= Fred Wilt =

American track and field athlete

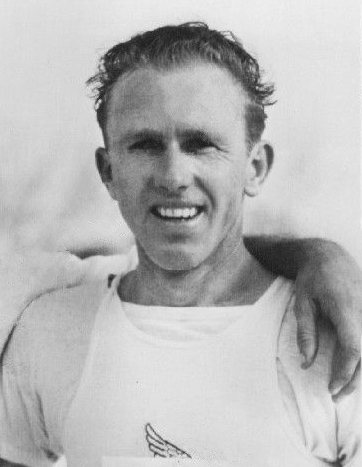
- Wilt in 1949

Personal information
- Full name: Frederick Loren Wilt
- Born: December 14, 1920 Pendleton, Indiana, U.S.
- Died: September 5, 1994 (aged 73) Anderson, Indiana, U.S.
- Education: Indiana University Bloomington
- Height: 5 ft 8 in (173 cm)
- Weight: 146 lb (66 kg)

Sport
- Sport: Athletics
- Events: 1500-marathon, steeplechase
- Club: New York Athletic Club
- Coached by: Billy Hayes

Achievements and titles
- Personal bests: 1500 m – 3:53.1 (1949); 5000 m – 14:26.8 (1950); 10,000 m – 30:41.2 (1952); Mar – 2:29:27 (1956); 3000 mS – 10:16.8 (1954)

Frederick Loren Wilt (December 14, 1920 – September 5, 1994) was an American runner and FBI agent. He competed in the 10,000 m at the 1948 and 1952 Olympics and finished 11th and 21st, respectively. Wilt held eight AAU titles, ranging from the indoor mile in 1951 to cross country in 1949 and 1952–53. He won the James E. Sullivan Award as best American amateur athlete in 1950. He was inducted into the National Track and Field Hall of Fame in 1981.

== Publications ==
Wilt's book Run Run Run was published in 1964 by Track & Field News. It contained chapters written by Wilt, notable coaches, including New Zealand's Arthur Lydiard, and Soviet gold medalist Vladimir Kuts, and went through six printings over the next ten years. In 1975, Wilt coined the term plyometrics while observing Soviet athletes warming up. He reached out to Dr. Michael Yessis, who had previously introduced this concept to the United States through Russian translation of Verkhoshansky's work. This inspired their later collaboration, to get this information out to U.S. coaches, and the book Soviet Theory, Technique and Training for Running and Hurdling. Wilt wrote and compiled multiple other books on track and field. After retirement from FBI he worked as head coach for the Cross Country and Track and Field Women's team at Purdue University.
