= Neale Stoner =

American college athletics coach and administrator (died 2023)

Biographical details
- Born: 1936
- Died: February 14, 2023 (aged 86); Escondido, California, U.S.

Playing career

Men's basketball
- 1960–1962: Orange County State

Men's tennis
- 1961–1962: Orange County State

Coaching career (HC unless noted)

Men's basketball
- 1966–1969: UC San Diego
- 1969–1972: Cal Poly

Men's golf
- 1993–2000: San Diego State

Men's tennis
- 1963–1964: Orange State
- 1966–1968: UC San Diego

Administrative career (AD unless noted)
- 1972–1979: Cal State Fullerton
- 1980–1988: Illinois
- 1990–1992: California Bowl (exec. dir.)

Head coaching record
- Overall: 86–65 (basketball)

Neale R. Stoner (1936 – February 14, 2023) was an American college athletics coach and administrator. He served as the head men's basketball coach at the University of California, San Diego from 1966 to 1969 and at California Polytechnic State University from 1969 to 1972, compiling a career college basketball coaching record of 86–65. Stoner was the athletic director at California State University, Fullerton from 1972 to 1979 and at the University of Illinois at Urbana–Champaign from 1980 to 1988.

== Education ==
Stoner attended Montebello High School and Fullerton Junior College. He graduated from Orange County State College in 1962 and received a Master of Education from California Polytechnic State University in 1975.

== Playing career ==
At Orange County State College—now known as California State University, Fullerton—Stoner played two years (1961 and 1962 seasons) on both the varsity men's basketball squad and tennis team. He played on the first Orange County State College men's basketball squad in the 1960–61 season, coached by Alex Omalev, which had a record 16–14. In 30 games played that season he averaged 13.9 points per game, scored 418 points total, and shot 84% from the free throw line.

== Coaching career ==
At Orange State College, Stoner coached Anaheim High School and Fullerton Junior College alumni tennis players Mike Bouck and Stan Kula for the Titans. During the 1962–63 tennis season at Orange State College he coached Rosalie Passovoy, who played on the Titans men's tennis team. Passovoy is the only female to have lettered on a male varsity sport program at the university.

== Death ==
Stoner died on February 14, 2023, at the age of 86, in Escondido, California.
