= Lynn Eilefson =

American college athletics administrator (1932–2001)

Biographical details
- Born: November 26, 1932; Billings, Montana, U.S.
- Died: May 25, 2001 (aged 68); Fresno, California, U.S.
- Education: University of Montana

Administrative career (AD unless noted)
- 1972–1980: Fresno State (staff)
- 1980–1982: UCLA (sr. assistant AD)
- 1982–1985: Cal State Fullerton
- 1985–1986: San Jose State

Lindberg E. Eilefson (November 26, 1932 – May 25, 2001) was an American college athletics administrator. He served as the athletic director at California State University, Fullerton from 1982 to 1985 and at San Jose State University from 1985 to 1986. Eilefson worked at California State University, Fresno during the 1970s in a number a positions before taking a job at the University of California, Los Angeles (UCLA) as senior assistant athletic director in 1980. A native of Billings, Montana, he graduated from the University of Montana.

Eilefson died on May 25, 2001, from cancer.
