= Mark Covert =

American runner

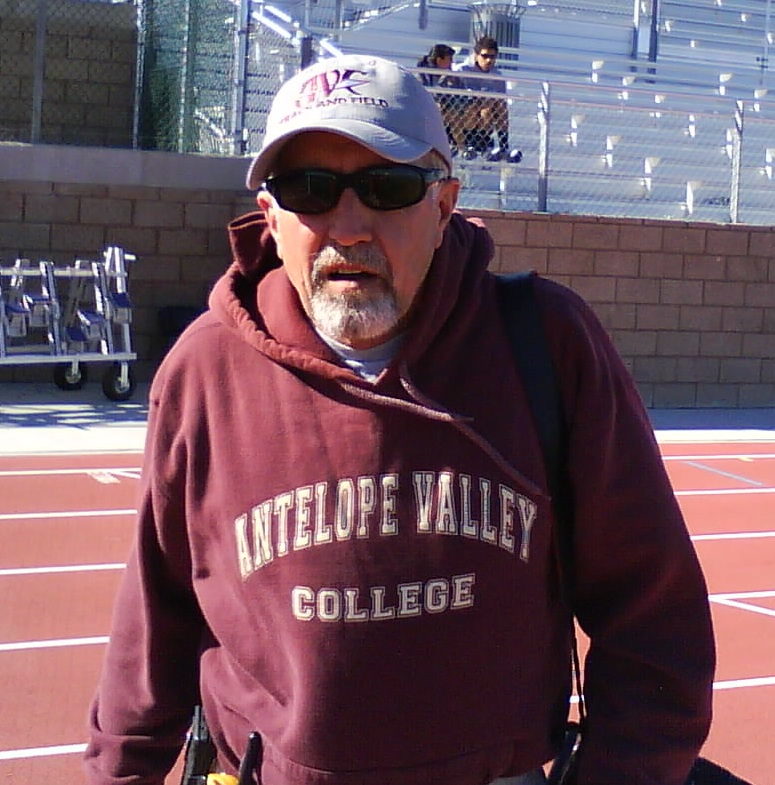
- Mark Covert in 2011

Personal information
- Born: November 17, 1950 (age 75)

Sport
- Sport: Running
- Retired: July 23, 2013

Mark Covert (born November 17, 1950) is an American runner. He is believed to maintain the second-longest streak of running every day in the world. Covert's running streak began on July 23, 1968, just after his senior year at Burbank High School in Burbank, California, and continued for exactly 45 years. Due to a chronic foot injury, Covert announced that he would end his streak after exactly 45 years on July 23, 2013 and he did as promised. His is the longest streak recorded by the United States Running Streak Association, followed closely by Jon Sutherland, who began less than a year after Covert. However, British runner Ron Hill is believed to have the longest continuous streak.

Covert has also run in competition, earning seventh place with a time of 2:23:35 in the 1972 US Olympic marathon trials. During those trials, Covert (then a runner for Fullerton State College) was the only surviving member of a pack of eight lesser-known runners to try to follow the blistering pace of Kenny Moore and eventual gold-medalist Frank Shorter, all the others failed to finish the race. By virtue of that race, he also claims the distinction of being the first person to cross a finish line wearing Nike brand shoes. In 1992 he was named to Nike's Hall of Fame.

Also while at Fullerton, he won the 1970 Division II NCAA Men's Cross Country Championship. He was part of their 1971 National Championship team. His personal best in the mile is 4:09 minutes, and he has run over 151,000 miles in total.

Between his time at Burbank and Fullerton, Covert attended Los Angeles Valley College, where he was coached by László Tábori. He was part of their 1968 State Championship Cross Country team. Later on the track. he set the still standing National Community College record for the 6 mile run at 28:53. American track governing bodies switched their measurement standards from Imperial measurements to metric by the early 1980s. In 2009, he was elected into the Los Angeles Valley College Hall of Fame.

In 2012, Cal State Fullerton named their early season Cross Country meet, the Mark Covert Classic

Covert has been Head Cross Country and Track and Field Coach at Antelope Valley College in Lancaster, California since 1990.
