= Michael Yessis =

American writer

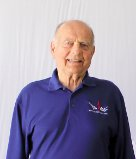
- Michael Yessis in 2011
- Born: June 16, 1932; Brooklyn, New York, United States
- Died: September 15, 2023 (aged 91); Escondido, California
- Occupations: Professor Emeritus, author, sports performance trainer, training and technique consultant, technique analysis specialist and athletic coach
- Notable work: Explosive Running, Explosive Plyometrics, Kinesology of Exercise
- Spouse: Edith R. Evans-Yessis
- Children: Marissa Yessis Prough
- Website: http://www.doctoryessis.com/

Michael Yessis (June 16, 1932 – September 15, 2023) was an American sports performance trainer who translated and adapted sports training methodology from the former Soviet Union.

== Biography ==
Michael Yessis earned a Ph.D. from the University of Southern California. In 1975, he and athlete Fred Wilt coined the term plyometrics while observing Soviet athletes warming up. In 1982, Yessis traveled to the Soviet Union to work with Yuri Verkhoshansky, a biomechanist and sports trainer.

Yessis' teaching career focused on a performance-based version of sports conditioning and training. Yessis authored 16 books and over 2,000 articles in various publications. He also appeared on television, radio, and the internet as an expert guest and commentator.

As a researcher and translator, Yessis made available Soviet books and journals created by Soviet sports-scientists to an English-speaking audience. Yessis' translations include Transfer of Training Volume I, Transfer of Training Volume II, Block Periodization Training, Special Strength Training: A Practical Manual for Coaches, Running, and Hurdling, and numerous Soviet journals. Yessis was a leader of a group of athletes, sports coaches, and strength coaches sent to the Soviet Union to study at the Moscow State Institute of Physical Culture.

Yessis was chief editor for two academic journals and senior editor for a Weider Publication. Yessis was the editor-in-chief for The Fitness and Sports Review International, a quarterly publication from 1966 to 1994. He also held the editor-in-chief position for Soviet Sports Review, a collection of translated journals from Soviet coaches and original articles from contributing writers, from 1968–1972. In addition, Yessis provided translation and original writing contributions to Soviet Sports Review. Yessis served as senior editor for Sports Fitness (a Weider Publication known today as Men's Fitness).

== Work as a Consultant ==
Yessis served as a training and technique consultant to the Los Angeles Rams and Los Angeles Raiders of the NFL and trained former All-American and Oakland Raider Marv Marinovich and his son, Todd Marinovich, helping Todd to become a first-round draft choice. Yessis served as a training and technique consultant to Evander Holyfield, professional beach volleyball player Dianne DeNecochea, and the U.S. Men's Olympic Volleyball Team. He has trained Olympians including; Edgar Oliveira, an Olympian who participated in Barcelona and Atlanta in the 1500m, and Joao N'tyamba, who participated in three Olympic games in the 800m and 1500m.

Yessis has written 16 books in the sports and fitness field. His column was published in Muscle & Fitness magazine for 25 years.

Yessis died on September 15, 2023, at the age of 91.

== Publications/books in English ==
- Explosive Tennis: The Forehand Sports Training, Inc. (2000)
- Explosive Running (2000)
- Explosive Golf: Using the Science of Kinesiology to Improve Your Swing (1998)
- Inspiring Others To Win. Griffing Publishing, 1998. (Chapter contribution).
- Sports and Fitness Success From 6 To 16 (1996)
- Body Shaping (1994).
- Kinesiology of Exercise (1992)
- Sports Restoration and Massage: Secrets Of The World's Greatest Superstars (1992)
- Secrets of Soviet Sports Fitness and Training (1987)
- Plyometric Training: Achieving Explosive Power in Sports (1986)
- Running and Hurdling Fred Wilt, Editor, Dr. Yessis Translator Championship Books, 1984
- Handball, 3rd Edition (1st Edition, 1966; 2nd Edition, 1972) William C. Brown, Publishers (1978)
