= Ernie Becker (Canadian football) =

Canadian football player (1925–2007)

Profile
- Position: Halfback

Personal information
- Born: April 27, 1925; Weimar Republic (Germany)
- Died: December 29, 2007 (aged 82); Kenora, Ontario, Canada
- Listed height: 5 ft 10 in (1.78 m)
- Listed weight: 194 lb (88 kg)

Career history
- 1951: Saskatchewan Roughriders
- 1952–1954: Winnipeg Blue Bombers

Ernest "Ernie" Becker (April 27, 1925 – December 29, 2007) was a Canadian football player who played for the Saskatchewan Roughriders and Winnipeg Blue Bombers. He also played for the Montreal Alouettes, Toronto Balmy Beach Beachers and Toronto Argonauts in the 1940s.

Ernie Becker was also an accomplished diver and swimmer. In 1935, he broke the Junior Canadian Record for the 50 yard Free Style in 24.0 seconds flat. He also held the Senior 100 yard Freestyle in swimming and both the Junior and Senior diving titles. He was employed for 39 years as the Aquatics Director at the Winnipeg Winter Club.
