= Ernest Becker (athletic director) =

American tennis player and coach (1914–1998)

Biographical details
- Born: 1914
- Died: January 5, 1998 (aged 83–84); Fullerton, California, U.S.

Coaching career (HC unless noted)

Men's Tennis
- 1960-62: Orange County State College

Administrative career (AD unless noted)
- 1963-64: Orange State College

Ernest A. Becker (1914 – January 5, 1998) was an American tennis player, coach, and college athletics administrator. He was a founding dean, first athletic director, and important influence at the beginning of Orange County State College, which became California State University, Fullerton. According to the Orange County Register, Becker

typed the first college catalog and launched the first student newspaper. He also staged an amazingly successful attention-getting event designed to put the young campus on the map: the "First Intercollegiate Elephant Race in Human History," held in 1962. It started as a joke but drew more than a dozen entries from universities around the world and was covered in 82 news publications. The elephants were rented from a Hollywood studio, and the largest was ridden by the editor of the Harvard University student newspaper, the Crimson.

Becker started out at Orange County State College as the founding dean of students in 1959 when he first came to the school. He was an emeritus philosophy professor. Becker was a major factor in choosing the school's athletic team nickname, the Titans.

== Educational degrees ==
- 1936 Graduate of Amherst College, BA received in history and philosophy
- USC graduate degree received in divinity
- USC doctoral degree received in higher education

== Military service ==
- World War II naval chaplain

== Collegiate tennis player ==
- During the mid-1930s Becker was a member of the Amherst College men's tennis team and is a "Mammoths Letterman" from competing on the team.

== Titans men's tennis coach ==
Athletic University Logo

He was instrumental in starting and coaching the early years of Orange County State College (known now as Cal State Fullerton Titans Tennis) varsity men's tennis team at the school in the early 1960s. Becker was well respected by his players on the team from team captain Mitchel Saadi '64, Dennis Silver '63, Ken Smith Jr., Ernie Lopez '64, Jim Blondin '63, Tony Keeling, Ben Wade '63 and George Rentfro '62 who all also looked at him as a father figure and mentor. In Becker's younger days he was quite a practice player and tennis enthusiast hitting tennis balls with the legendary tennis professional Bill Tilden according to his players on the team at Fullerton he loved talking about tennis.

== Pachyderm race ==
According to Jack Hale, later an insurance agent in Anaheim, he and Becker brainstormed the idea of hosting an intercollegiate elephant race as a way of relating elephants to the college team nickname "Titans" - a nickname which Becker had promoted and which had been chosen by a student vote in 1959. As a result of the 1962 races, an elephant was chosen as the mascot or symbol of the Titans.

Hale had lived in Africa and Becker had done postgraduate work in India. Early plans to race the Coast Guard failed, but eventually on May 11, 1962, a total of 15 elephants raced, with "Sunita" of the Harvard Crimson winning. The event was televised live and was one of the Associated Press' Top 10 stories of 1962, and it put the Orange County school into national level awareness.

Various accounts of the idea for the elephant race exist, but most involve Becker near the center.

Harvard's The Crimson coverage in 1962 includes mention that "Orange State, a new school in the California state college system, is scheduled to grow to more than 25,000 students within 15 years," and that "the school has large tracts of unimproved land which, according to Becker, 'make ideal elephant pastures.'"

Pachyderm association with Fullerton may also have related to the growing and packaging of Elephant oranges, a local, huge variety of the Valencia orange, see Elephant Packing House, a listed historic site in Fullerton.

== Tragedy ==
Becker was repeatedly in the news also relating to trials and followups to a family tragedy; Becker's son Stephen was among seven killed in a shooting spree on the Fullerton campus. Becker occasionally commented about the convicted killer, when contacted by media at times of appeal hearings.
