= Rosalie Passovoy =

American tennis player (1930–2019)

Passovoy in 1963

Athletic University Logo

Rosalie Passovoy (January 3, 1930 – October 8, 2019) was an American men's collegiate tennis player.

== Biography ==
Passovoy was born in Paterson, New Jersey. She was ahead of her time in the early 1960s, both on the court and in life. Her tennis skills earned her a place in collegiate tennis history and a place in her school's sports history as a female who competed on the 1963 men's tennis team at Orange State College (now known as California State University, Fullerton) and lettered on the team in her senior class year. At the time she was a married mother of three children. Passovoy remains the only female in the school's sports history to letter on a male varsity sport's program at the school. She accomplished this by beating players already on the Titans' team in challenge matches with her powerful forehand groundstroke and serving skills. There was no Titans' women's tennis team until three years later when the program began in 1966. If Passovoy wanted to play, it had to be on the men's tennis team. The team's number one singles player that year was Mike Bouck who had transferred after playing one year of collegiate tennis at UCLA for legendary Bruin head coach J.D. Morgan with four all-American teammates including Allen Fox on a team that was highly ranked nationally in collegiate men's tennis. Stan Smith, brother of C. Ken Smith ('63), was also a member on the 1963 Titan team. Her other teammate on the '63 Titan team, Neil Stenton ('64), said, "The fact that she was on the team was an amazing accomplishment in itself" and that "she was a pretty darn good player to be able to be on that team".

== Education ==
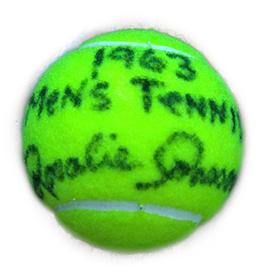
Passovoy '63 Autographed Titans Tennis Ball

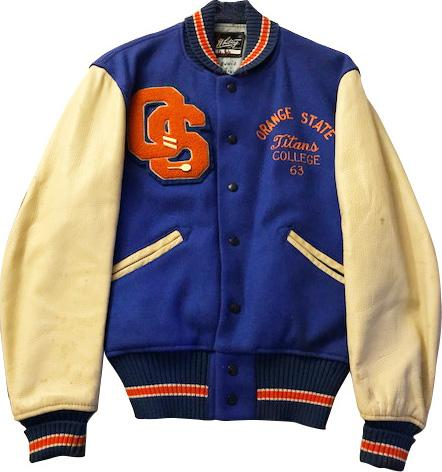
1963 Orange State College (CSUF) Titans Mens Tennis Authentic Lettermen's Jacket

Bachelor of Arts Degree in Humanities in 1963 at Orange State College (now known as California State University, Fullerton).

Master's degree in Journalism.

Phi Kappa Phi National Honor Society member.

Passovoy was the eldest member of the "Titans Letterwinners Club" as of 2019.

== Death ==
Rosalie Passovoy lived her last years in life in San Diego, California, near her family and she died on October 8, 2019, at the age of 89 years old; she suffered from Alzheimer's disease in her later years.
