= Vertical jump =

Jump vertically in the air

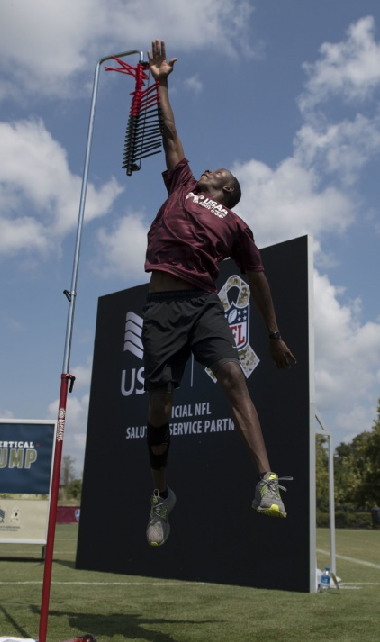
The vertical jump measurement test is designed to measure an athlete's ability to perform powerfully. The measurement method seen here is an improved version of the chalk on finger method. The device used is known as a vertical jump tester.

A vertical jump or vertical leap is the act of jumping upwards into the air. It can be an exercise for building both endurance and strength, and is also a standard test for measuring athletic performance. It may also be referred to as a Sargent jump, named for Dudley Allen Sargent.

== Types ==
The vertical jump is divided into two different types:

- Standing vertical jump: This refers to a vertical jump done from a standstill with no steps being involved at all. It is usually preceded by a quick crouching action.
- Running vertical jump: This refers to a vertical jump after a run up: the last step of the run is used to launch into the jump. This may help to add additional energy to the jump and improve on the standing vertical jump result.

In general, the standing vertical jump is the one that is used as an official measurement for athletes.

== Usage ==
Vertical jump measurements are used primarily to measure athletic performance. In sports such as high jump, netball, basketball, Australian rules football, volleyball, figure skating and swimming a strong vertical jump is a necessary skill, but many other sports measure their players' vertical jump ability during physical examinations. In addition, single and multiple vertical jumps are occasionally used to assess muscular strength and anaerobic power in athletes.

== Measurement ==
The simplest method to measure an athlete's vertical jump is to get the athlete to reach up against a flat wall, with a flat surface under their feet (such as a gym floor or concrete) and record the highest point they can reach flat-footed (the height of this point from the ground is referred to as "standing reach"); fingertips powdered with chalk can facilitate the determination of points touched on the wall. The athlete then makes an effort to jump up with the goal of touching the highest point on the wall that he or she can reach; the athlete can perform these jumps as many times as needed. The height of the highest point the athlete touches is recorded. The difference between this height and the standing reach is the athlete's vertical jump.

The method described above is the most common and simplest way to measure one's vertical jump, but other more accurate methods have been devised. A pressure pad can be used to measure the time it takes for an athlete to complete a jump, and then using a kinematics equation (h = g × t^{2}/8), the computer can calculate their vertical jump based on the time in the air.

A second, more efficient and correct method is to use an infrared laser placed at ground level. When an athlete jumps and breaks the plane of the laser with their hand, the height at which this occurs is measured. Devices based on United States Patent 5031903, "A vertical jump testing device comprising a plurality of vertically arranged measuring elements each pivotally mounted..." are also common. These devices are used at the highest levels of collegiate and professional performance testing. They are composed of several (roughly 70) 14-inch prongs placed 0.5 inches apart vertically. An athlete will then leap vertically (no running start or step) and make contact with the retractable prongs to mark their leaping ability. This device is used each year at the NFL scouting combine.

== Maximising jump height ==
An important element in maximising vertical jump height is an immediately preceding crouching action which preloads the muscles. This crouching action is usually performed quickly and referred to as a counter-movement: the rapid bending of the legs and the movement of the arms to the person's sides constitute the counter-movement to the actual jumps range of movement. The counter-movement and the jump collectively are referred to as a counter-movement jump (CMJ). The counter-movement of the legs, a quick bend of the knees which lowers the center of mass prior to springing upwards, has been shown to improve jump height by 12% compared to jumping without the counter-movement. This is standardly attributed to the stretch shortening cycle (SSC) e.g. the stretch of the muscles which occurs during the crouch generates a greater potential for the muscles to contract in the subsequent jump, which allows the jump to be performed more powerfully. Furthermore, jump height can be increased another 10% by executing arm swings during the take off phase of the jump compared to if no arm swings are utilized. This involves lowering the arms to the sides during the legs' counter-movements, and powerfully thrusting them up and over the head during the jump. However, despite these increases due to technical adjustments, some researchers consider that optimizing both the force producing and elastic properties of the musculotendinous system in the lower limbs is partially determined by genetics, though resistance exercise training is required to reach potential.

Another method for improving vertical jump height is the use of an isometric preload jump (IPJ). This is similar to a CMJ with the difference being that the crouched position is not rapidly assumed in order to maximise the influence of the SSC. An IPJ involves a crouched position being assumed for a longer period of time in the interests of maximising the ability to isometrically preload the muscles. This form of preload should be considered as being an isometric press rather than an isometric hold. This is because the primary intention is not to maximise the length of the crouch, which would entail a different posture, but to generate increased power via the isometric press which is formed by the downward pressure from the torso onto the bent legs, and the upwards force from the bent legs which resist this pressure in equal measure. The analogy of a coiled spring is sometimes used to describe this process. In terms of their application of this isometric preload method of maximising power generation during the crouched phase, the jumper instinctively and intuitively performs the crouch in the interests of intensifying the feeling of preload in the muscles and especially in the glutes, thighs, and core. From their crouching posture they then spring upwards and channel the power they have previously generated into the jump. In consideration of the respective benefits of CMJs and IPJs, some researchers have found that the difference between the two preloading methods is negligible in terms of influencing jump height, which may indicate that the contribution from elastic energy in both forms of jump was similar. However, the CMJ is still the most popular method for improving and attaining vertical jump measurements.

== Vertical jump and power output ==
Vertical jumps are used to both train and test for power output in athletes. Plyometrics are particularly effective in training for power output, and include different types of vertical jumps. In one recent study, plyometric training (which included continuous vertical jumps) was combined with varying forms of resistance training. The improvement in jump height was similar for the different combinations. This suggested that it was primarily the plyometric training which was responsible for the improvement in vertical jump height and not the varying forms of resistance training. Research into plyometric jumps found vertical jumps to be among the most influential in terms of muscle recruitment (as measured by electromyography), power output, and ground reaction force produced. Fatigue has been researched in athletes for its effect on vertical jump performance, and found to decrease it in basketball players, tennis players, cyclists, rugby players, and healthy adults of both genders.

== See also ==
- Flywheel training
