= Split (gymnastics) =

Extending legs in opposite directions

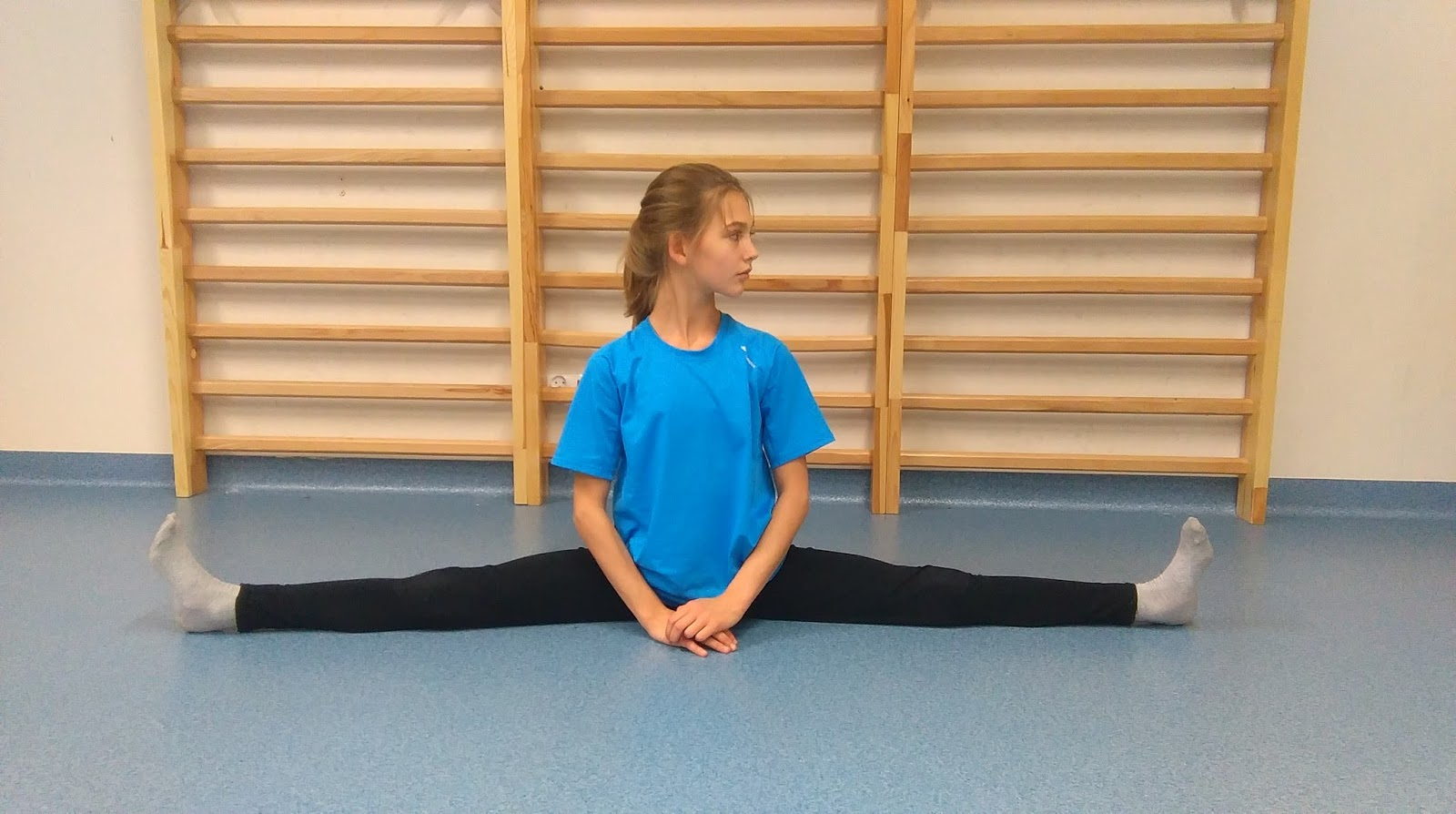
A side split

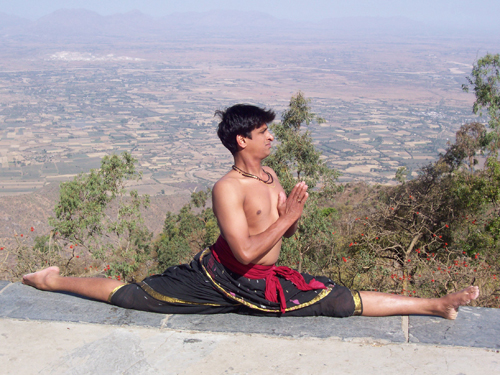
A front split in yoga; the pose is named Hanumanasana

A split (commonly referred to as splits or the splits) is a physical position in which the legs are in line with each other and extended in opposite directions. Splits are commonly performed in various athletic activities, including dance, figure skating, gymnastics, contortionism, synchronized swimming, cheerleading, martial arts, hockey goaltender, aerial arts and yoga as exercise, where a front split is named Hanumanasana and a side split is named Samakonasana. A person who has assumed a split position is said to be "in a split", or "doing the splits", or "doing a split" (this form is especially encountered in the Eastern United States).

When executing a split, the lines defined by the inner thighs of the legs form an angle of approximately 180 degrees. This large angle significantly stretches, and thus demonstrates excellent flexibility of, the hamstring and iliopsoas muscles. Consequently, splits are often used as a stretching exercise to warm up and enhance the flexibility of leg muscles. A split that goes beyond 180° is called an oversplit.

== Variations ==
There are two general forms of splits:

- Side splits are executed by extending the legs to the left and right of the torso. Side splits are called straddle splits (or middle splits) in dance and yoga, and may be referred to as Chinese splits in martial arts. Other names include box splits and center splits; in yoga the pose is named Samakonasana.
- Front splits are executed by extending one leg forward of, and the other leg to the rear of the torso. In dance, a front split is named according to the leg that is extended forward (e.g., the right leg is extended forward when executing a right split). In yoga, a front split is called Hanumanasana. Front splits require hyper-extension of the iliofemoral ligament, otherwise the majority of the range of motion must come from the front hip joint.

There are many variations of form and performance of splits, including:

- Oversplit, in which the angle between the legs exceeds 180 degrees.
- Suspended split, in which the body is static and supported only by the feet.
- Split leap or split jump is a split that is executed after leaping or jumping, respectively, while still in the air. In figure skating, split jumps are sometimes called Russian jumps. They can be done as an exercise.
- Standing split or vertical split, in which the leg lines are oriented vertically either to the side or to the front. This can also be an oversplit and a front oversplit with the back arched backwards.
- Twisting split is performed by transitioning from front split to side split, and then to the opposite front split.
- Martial arts split is a front split in which the back leg is rotated so the inside edge of the foot rests on the ground. It is more commonly named a "half split".

=== Gallery ===
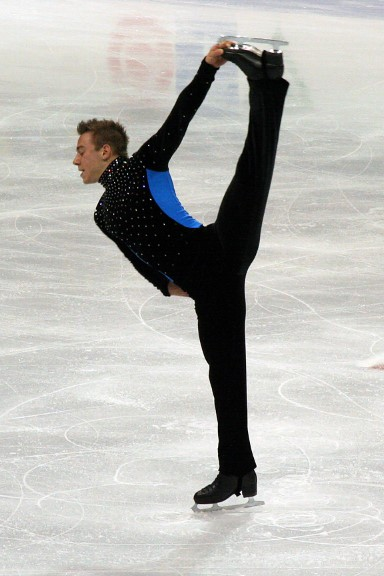
A standing split during a figure skating spin

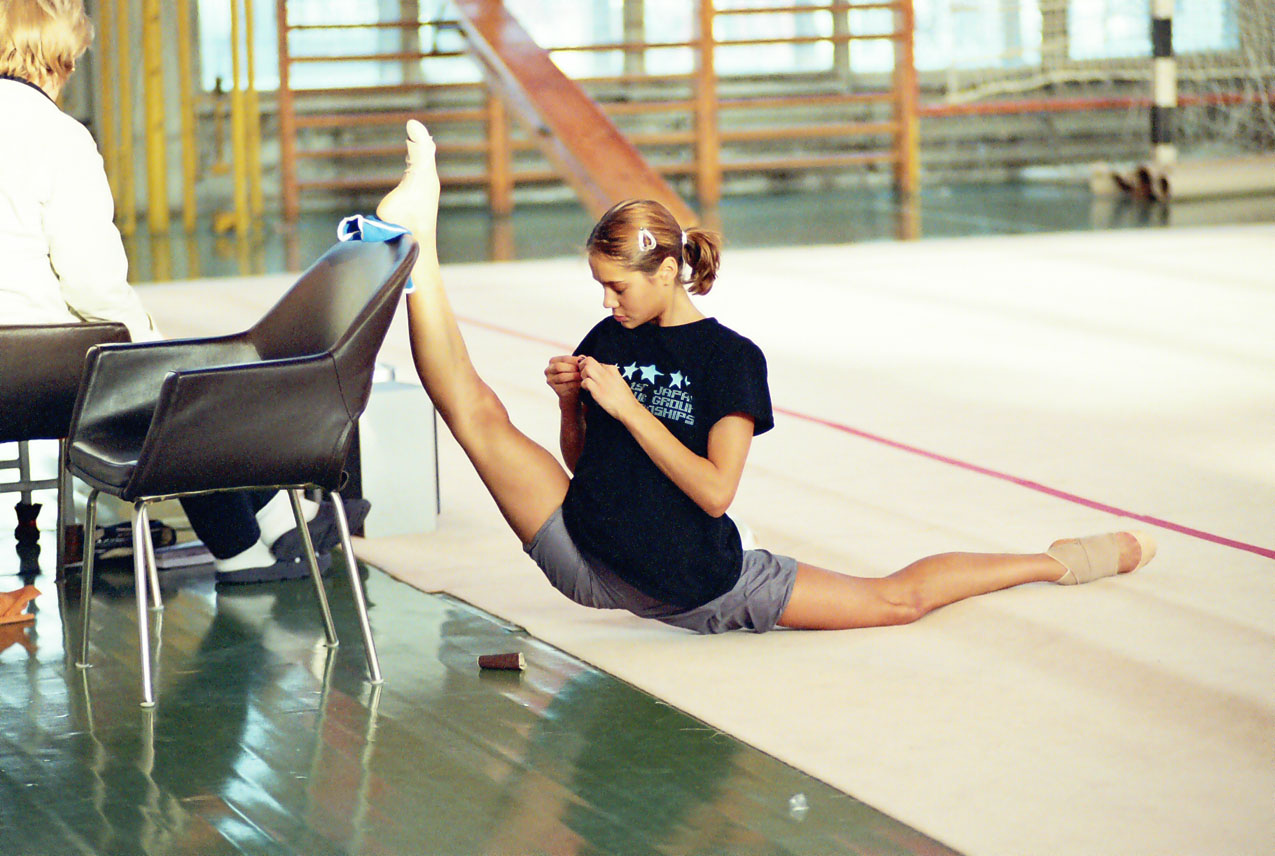
An oversplit

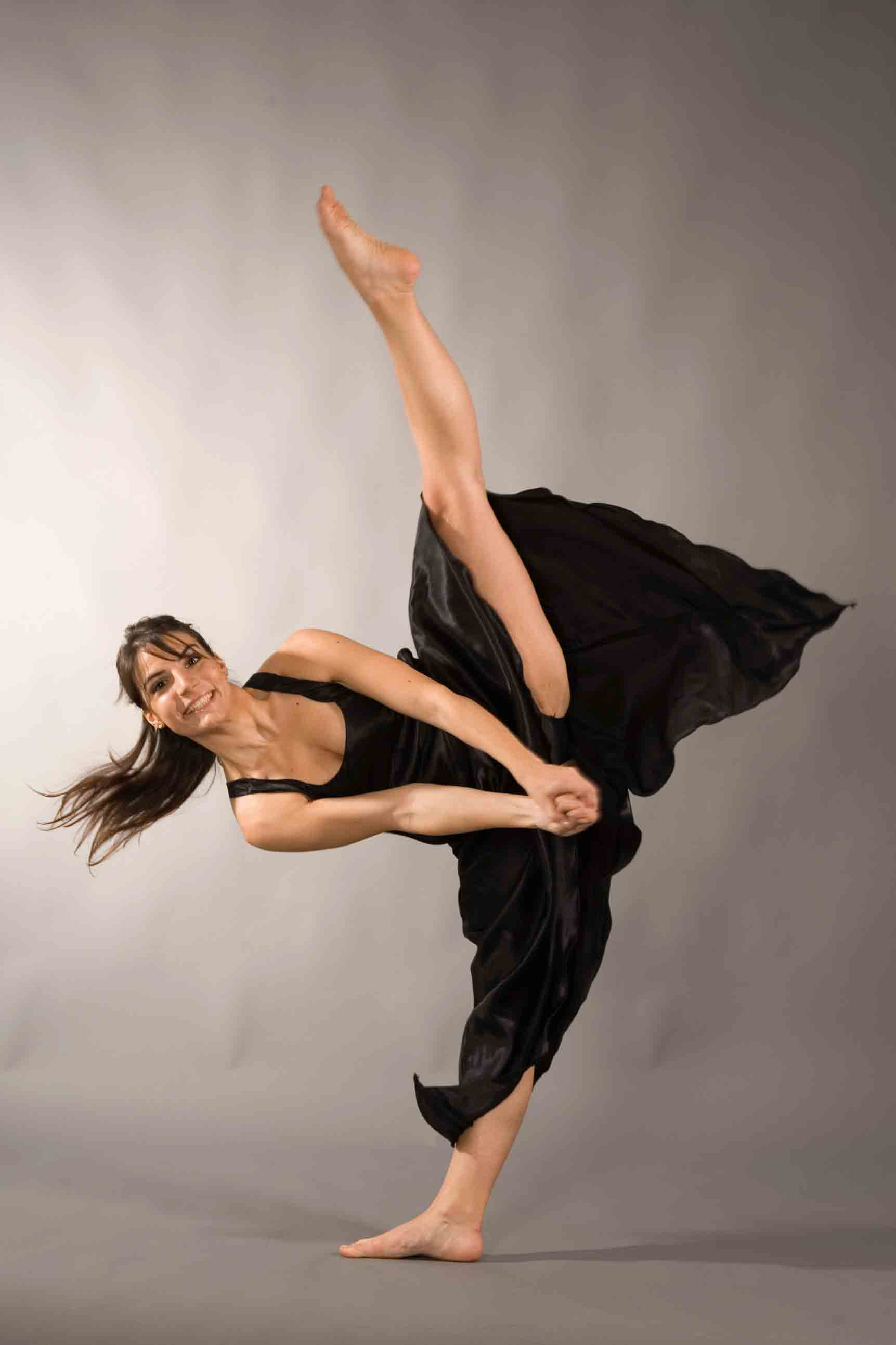
A standing side oversplit

An acro dancer performing a straddle split leap

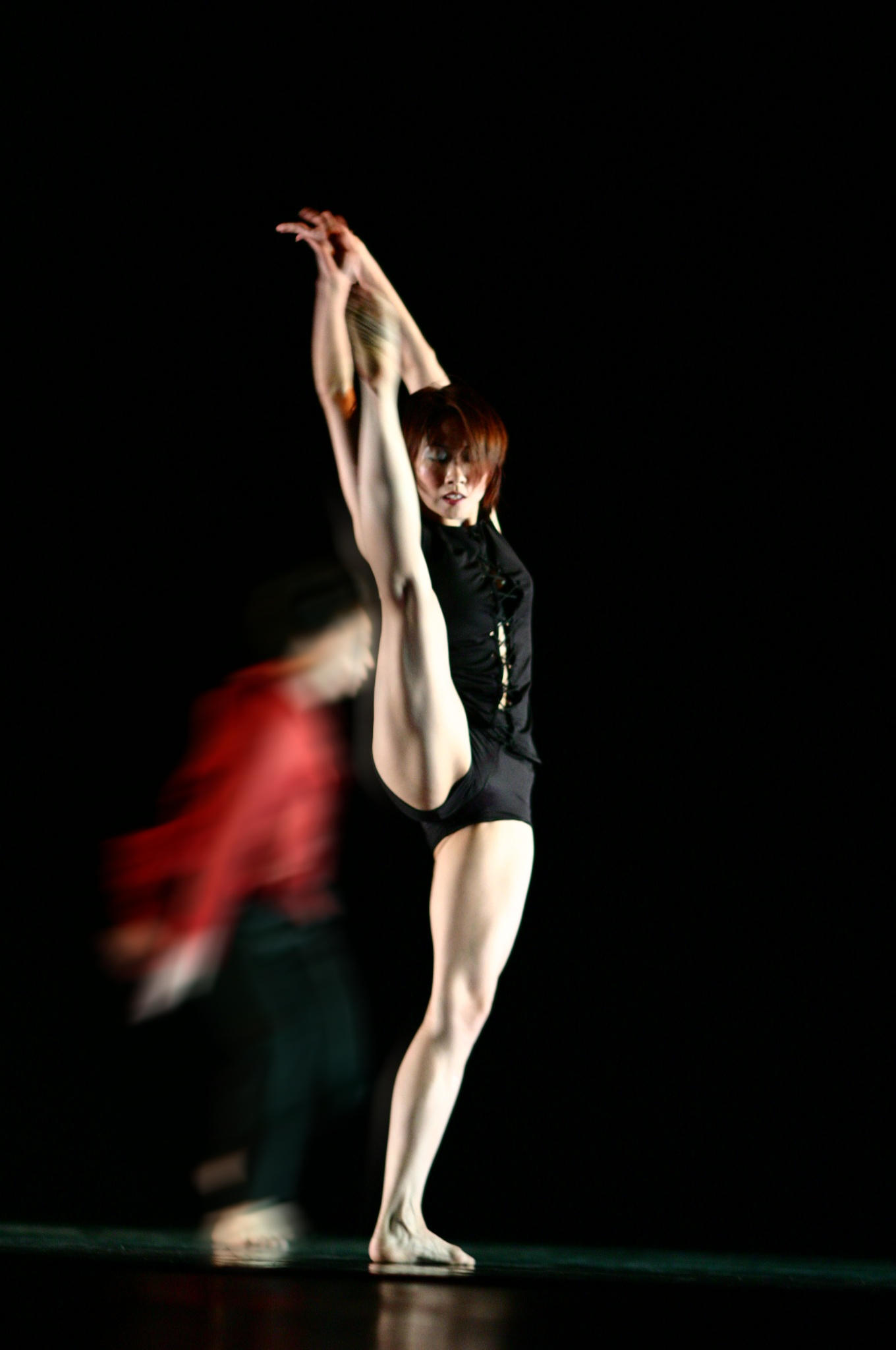
A standing front split

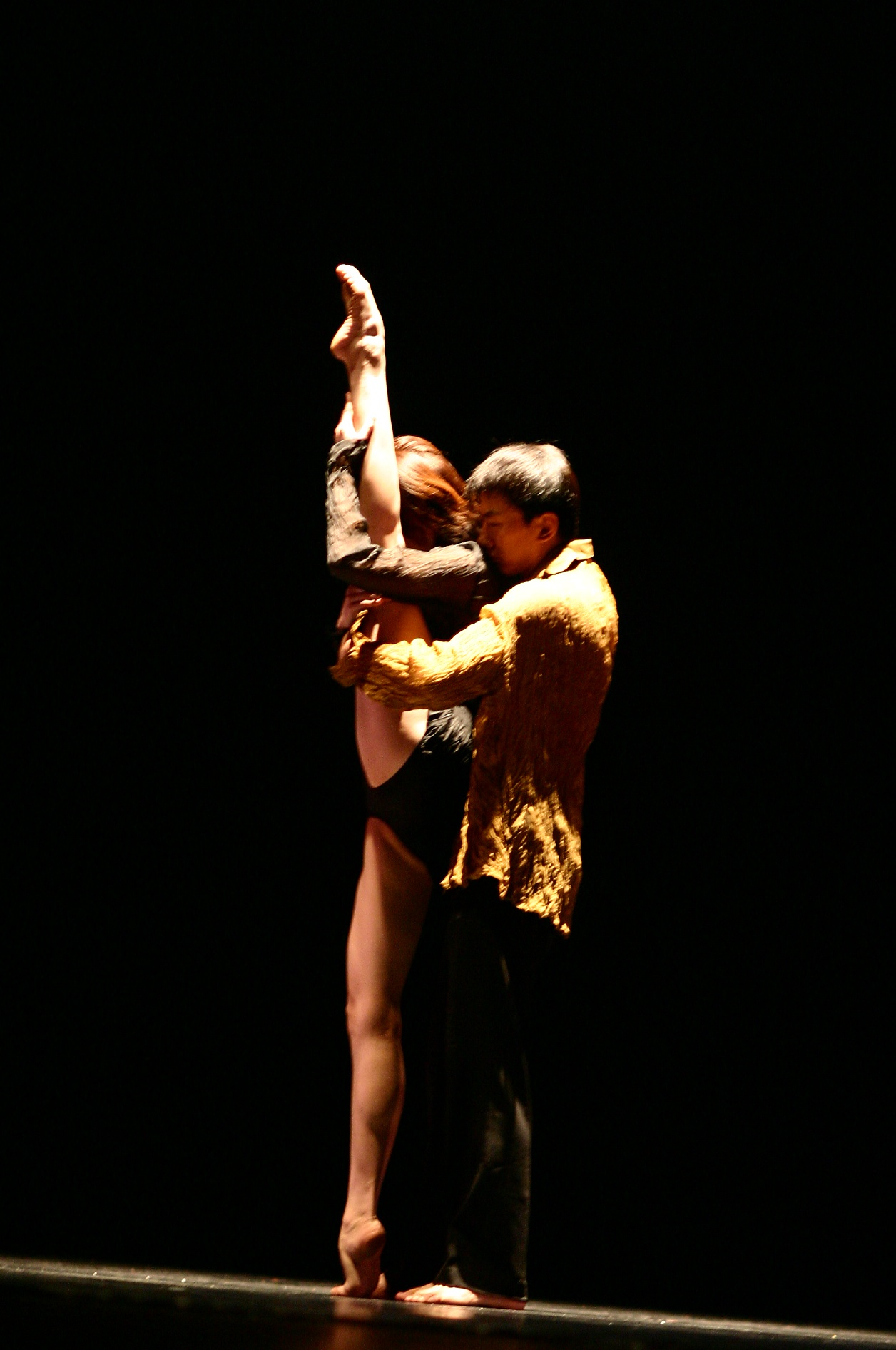
A partnered standing front split

== Problems ==
A common problem encountered during a side split is pain in the hip joints. Usually, the reason for this is that the split is being performed improperly (the pelvis may need to be tilted forward). Another common problem encountered during splits (both front and side) is pain in the knees.

== Popular culture ==
Many people lack the flexibility required to execute a split and thus regard splits to be uncomfortable or even painful. Because of this widespread view, splits appear in slapstick comedy, schadenfreude, and other forms of entertainment.

Actor Jean-Claude Van Damme performed a split between two moving trucks in a Volvo advertisement titled The Epic Split.

== See also ==
- Stretching
- Butterfly Pose
