= Jumping jack =

Physical jumping exercise

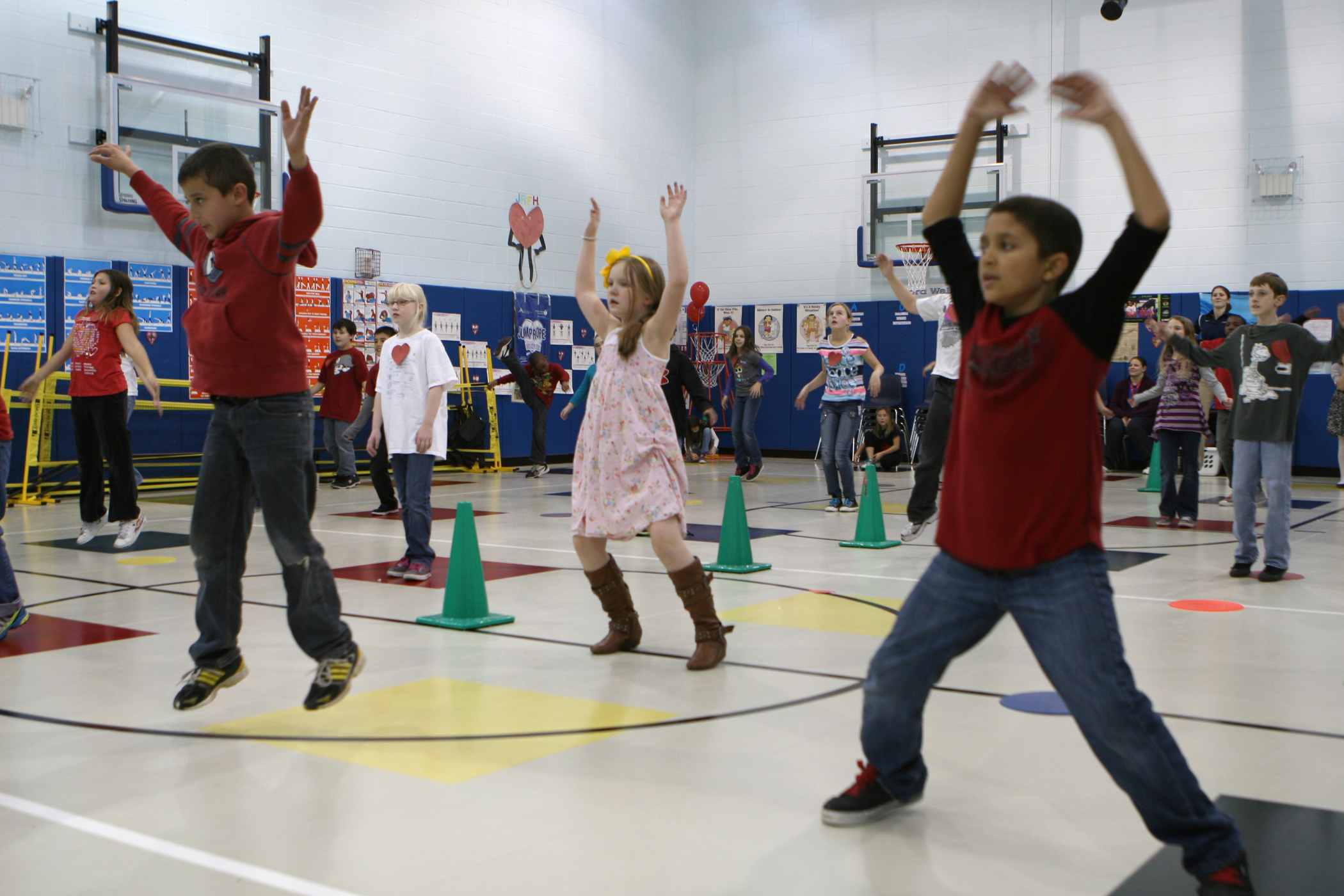
Schoolchildren in the US performing jumping jacks.

Jumping Jacks GIF animation

A jumping jack, also known as a star jump and called a side-straddle hop in the US military, is a physical jumping exercise performed by jumping to a position with the legs spread wide. The hands go overhead, sometimes in a clap, and then return to a position with the feet together and the arms at the sides.

The jumping jack exercise's origin is said to date back to 1885 as a method of hazing underclassmen at West Point Military Academy by John J. "Black Jack" Pershing, who is said to have developed it. "[Pershing] would line up a group of plebes, order them to count off to identify odds and evens, and when he pulled on an imaginary string, all the odds threw their arms stiffly out at right angles to their bodies; then Jack pulled the string in the opposite direction, and the odds dropped their arms and evens jumped their legs out to make a V. Back and forth went the string, arms flapped, legs splayed, while upperclassmen howled at the marionettes in action." The exercise is sometimes erroneously thought to be named after the general, but the name actually comes from the jumping jack children's toy, which makes similar arm swing and leg splay motions when the strings are tugged.

Although he did not invent the exercise, the late fitness expert Jack LaLanne was credited for popularizing it in the United States. LaLanne used the jumping exercise during routines he promoted in decades of television fitness programming.

== Variations and progression ==
The exercise can be made more or less intense with different variations. In general, squatting deeper will make jumps more difficult, although not resulting in greater height than squats at <90. According to studies, greater height is achieved when jumping from a shallower squat position (star jumps are often performed from a quarter squat position). In contrast, deeper squats are more effective at improving vertical jump height.

=== Low impact ===
The legs are stepped to the side without jumping, with the knees slightly bent and aligned with the ankles.

In an intermediate variation, the legs hop out to shoulder width while raising the arms, then hop back together while lowering the arms.

=== Power jacks ===
Power jacks are like jumping jacks, but land in a wide squat position. As with other jumps, jumping out of a deeper squat position increases the intensity of the exercise, and this can result in injury if proper form is not maintained in the deep squat position between successive jumps. Power jacks can be performed over multiple counts to pull the legs back to center, with two small incremental jumps to return to the starting position.

=== Squat jacks ===
Squat jacks are performed by jumping the legs out and in while staying in a half squat position.

=== Star jumps ===
Star jumps are more explosive and performed with greater height than regular jumping jacks. Instead of landing in a wide stance, the legs are swung out laterally in the air and pulled back to center to land in a tucked, narrow squat. They are a rebounding jump beginning and landing in the tucked narrow squat position to continue successive jumps.

=== Half jacks ===
A similar jump exercise is half-jacks. They were created to prevent rotator cuff injuries, which have been linked to the repetitive movements of the exercise. They are like regular jumping jacks, but the arms go halfway above the head instead of all the way above it. The arms also hit the sides to help tighten the jump.

=== Split jacks ===
The split jack is a variation on the jumping jack, similar to the split jump. It is performed by standing in a staggered stance, while having the right foot in front of the left. Then the actual jumps are done while swinging an arm opposite the jumping foot, switching legs throughout the process.

== Records ==
The most jumping jacks performed in one minute is 136 - achieved by Binod Thapa in Kathmandu, Nepal, on 28 July 2023.

In 2010, National Geographic Kids organized an event in 1,050 locations as a part of Michelle Obama's "Let's Move!" exercise campaign in which 300,365 people were measured doing jumping jacks (for one minute) in 24 hours.
