= Plyo box =

Exercise equipment

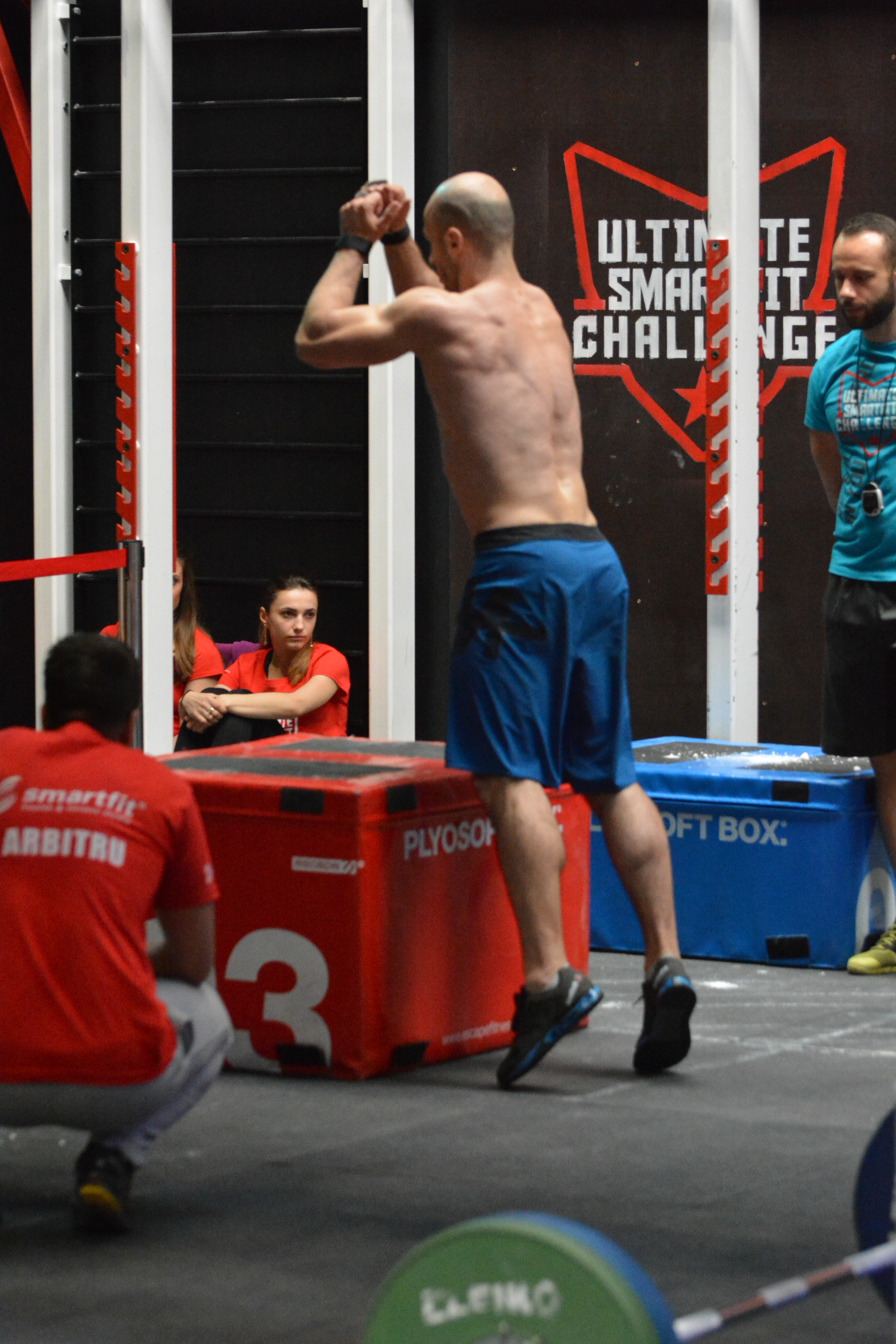
Man jumping onto a plyometric box

A plyometric box, also simply known as a plyo box or jump box, is a piece of training equipment used for plyometric exercises. Plyometric exercises are a type of explosive power training that uses muscle elasticity to produce rapid, forceful movements. The plyometric box provides a stable platform for performing plyometric exercises such as box jumps, box squats, and box step-ups.

Plyometric boxes are used by athletes and trainers to improve explosive power, speed, and agility. They are also used by physical therapists to help patients rehabilitation from injury.

== Design ==
Plyometric boxes are typically made of wood, metal, or plastic, and come in a variety of sizes. The size of the box is determined by the height of the user and the desired level of difficulty for the exercise. For example, a taller person may need a taller box for a box jump, while a smaller person may need a smaller box for a box step-up. The box is typically a rectangular box with 50 x 60 x 75 cm (20 x 24 x 30 inch) sides.

== Exercises ==
Plyometric box exercises can be performed with bodyweight only, or with added weight such as dumbbells, barbells or weighted vests.

Some common plyometric exercises include:

- Box jump
- Box squats
- Glute bridges
- Leap frogs
- Incline/decline push-ups
- Step-ups
- Triceps dips

== Injuries ==
Plyometric boxes can also be a source of injuries if used improperly. Common injuries associated with plyometric boxes include sprains, strains, and fractures.

These injuries can occur when the box is used for an exercise that it is not meant for, such as a box jump, or when the box is not properly secured and collapses during an exercise. To avoid injuries, it is important to use the correct type of box for the exercise being performed and to make sure the box is properly secured before using it.

== See also ==
- Assault course
- Freerunning
- Parkour
