= Plyometrics =

Maximum-intensity explosive exercises

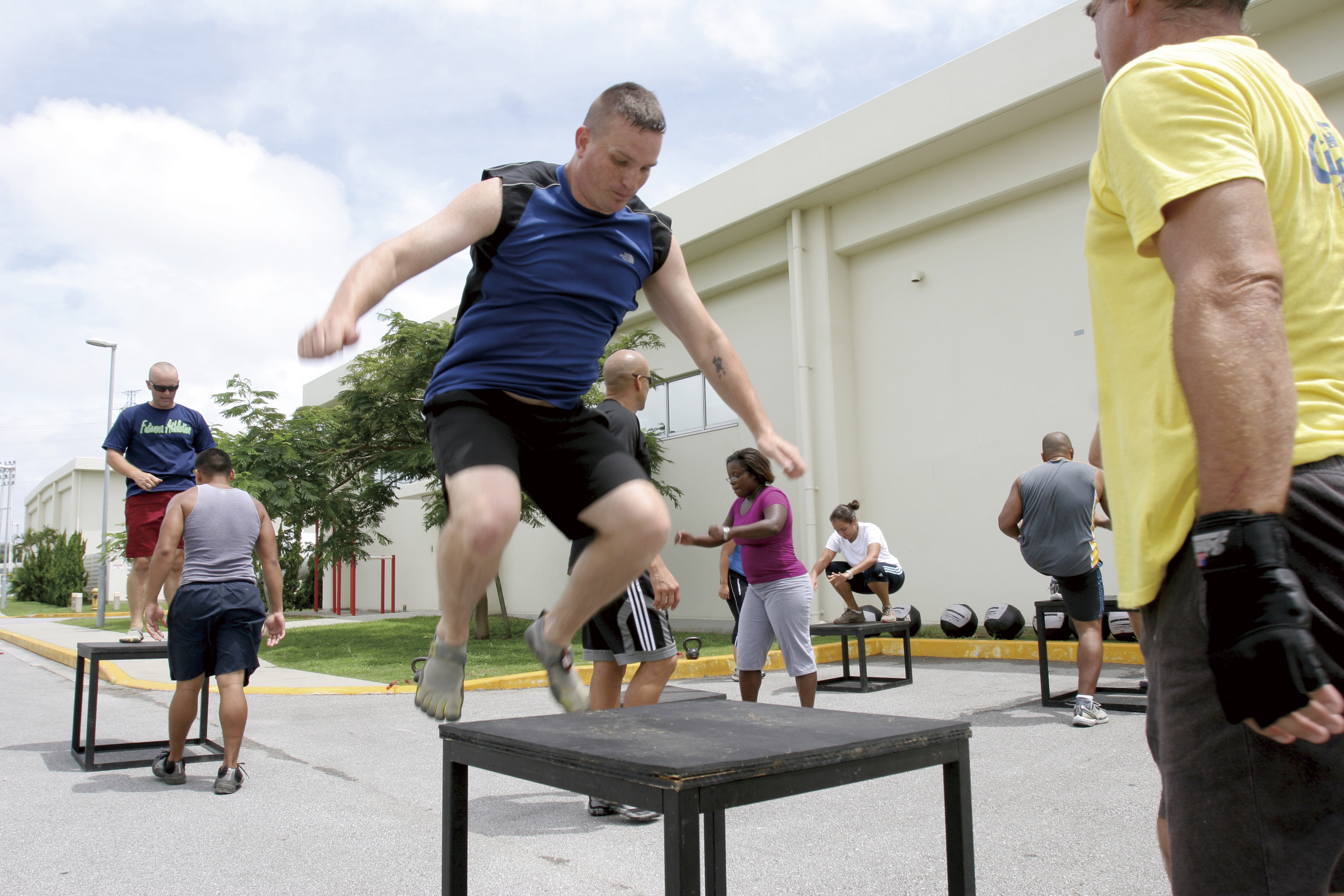
A US Marine performs plyometric jumps in Camp Foster, Okinawa

Plyometrics, also known as plyos, are exercises in which muscles exert maximum force in short intervals of time, and activate a rapid stretch-shortening cycle where muscles quickly alternate between states of extension and contraction. While commonly associated with jumping, plyometrics can also include explosive upper-body movements, such as plyometric push-ups, with the goal of increasing upper-body power (speed-strength).

This training focuses on learning to move from a muscle extension to a contraction in a rapid or "explosive" manner, such as in specialized repeated jumping. The amortization phase (transition from extension to contraction) must be very brief, as a slow transition will not fully release elastic energy stored in the eccentric phase, and instead some stored energy leaks away as heat. For example, a person lands after jumping, safely absorbs any shock, and immediately recovers balance and energy. As the leg bends, the thigh (quadricep) muscles extend. The amortization phase begins which involves the reorientating and channelling of the stored muscular energy from the landing, shock absorption and immediate recovery phase into the preparatory and preloading action for the jump. This energy is then subsequently channelled into the main jumping action which involves the thigh muscles contracting. In plyometrics, it is important that the amortization phase is completed as quickly as possible in order to maximise the potential to bridge between the landing and jumping actions and transfer energy between them. The rapid changes of a plyometric jump cycle are designed to harness the body's stretch-shortening cycle to a greater extent than would be possible otherwise. Describing the changes as occurring between phases of muscle extension and contraction is a simplification of the overall process which is more complex and involves a system of simultaneously occurring and interconnected muscle extensions and contractions.

Stretch shortening cycle training loads tendons elastically and when done properly, it can yield benefits including improved landing mechanics, force absorption, joint stability and greater force and power output, with transferability to many athletic activities, such as sprinting, where similar repetitive movements are required. Progressive plyometric training can also help to reduce the chances of injury, especially to the lower leg, ankle and foot.

Plyometrics are frequently used by athletes, especially martial artists, sprinters and high jumpers, to improve performance, and are used in the general fitness field to a lesser degree.

== Overview ==
Plyometrics include explosive exercises to activate the quick response and elastic properties of the major muscles. It was initially adopted by Soviet Olympians in the 1950s, and then by sportspeople worldwide. Sports using plyometrics include basketball, tennis, badminton, squash and volleyball as well as the various codes of football. The term "plyometrics" was coined by Fred Wilt after watching Soviet athletes prepare for their events in track and field. He began a collaboration with trainer Michael Yessis to promote plyometrics.

Since its introduction in the early 1980s, two forms of plyometrics have evolved. In the original version, created by Soviet scientist Yuri Verkhoshansky, it was defined as the shock method. In this, the athlete would drop down from a height and experience a "shock" upon landing. This in turn would bring about a forced eccentric contraction which was then immediately switched to a concentric contraction as the athlete jumped upward. The landing and takeoff were executed in an extremely short period of time, in the range of 0.1–0.2 second. Explosive plyometrics describes the approach originally created by Verkhoshansky. He experimented with many different exercises, but the depth jump appeared to be the best for duplicating the forces in the landing and takeoff.

The second version of plyometrics, seen to a greater extent in the United States, involves any form of jump regardless of execution time.

== Etymology ==
The term plyometric is a combination of Greek words πλείων (pleíōn), which means "more", and μέτρον (métron) "measure". Fred Wilt admits that it is not a very good term, but it was the best he could come up with. The spelling that would match the Greek origin is pliometrics. Several imaginary Greek words that would explain the y have been cited.

== History ==
Fred Wilt, a former US Olympic long-distance runner, is credited with coining the term plyometrics after watching the Soviets execute jumps in their warm-ups prior to their event in track and field. He could not understand why the Soviets were doing all of these jumps while the Americans were doing multiple static stretches, but he firmly believed it was one of the reasons why they were so successful in many events. From its beginnings in the early 1980s, the term plyometrics gained greater popularity and is now well established. When Fred Wilt learned of the work being done by Michael Yessis in the field of Soviet training methods, they quickly teamed up to help disseminate information on plyometrics.

In collaboration with Yessis who visited and worked with Verkhoshansky in the Soviet Union in the early 1980s, plyometrics was gradually disseminated in the US. Yessis brought this information on plyometrics back to the US and in the following years was able to create even more ways of using this method to train and improve explosive power.

Plyometrics (the shock method) was created by Yuri Verkhoshansky in the late 1960s, early 1970s. Since then, the shock method of plyometrics is still being practiced for improvement of athletic performance by what appears to be a relatively limited number of athletes. These athletes still do depth jumps, the key exercise in the shock method, according to the guidelines established by Verkhoshansky.

Most athletes execute simple and complex jumps and call them plyometrics rather than jump training as it was called in the past. This includes the depth jump which was executed in ways different from what was recommended by Verkhoshansky. This form of jump training is very popular but plyometrics is a buzzword for all types of jumps, regardless of how long it takes to execute the jump. Its use is so pervasive that it is even possible to find push-ups described as being plyometric.

Due to the wide use and appeal of the term plyometrics, the true meaning of plyometrics as developed by Verkhoshansky has for the most part been forgotten. Verkhoshansky was well known and respected worldwide in both the scientific and in the coaching arenas. He was relatively unknown in the United States except for some of his articles that were translated and published in the Soviet Sports Review, later called the Fitness and Sports Review International.

In addition to creating the shock method, Verkhoshansky is credited with developing the stretch-shortening concept of muscle contractions and the development of specialized (dynamic correspondence) strength exercises. Plyometrics, or more specifically the shock method, is considered a form of specialized strength development.

Before undertaking plyometric training, it is necessary to distinguish jumps that are commonly called plyometric and true plyometric jumps as exemplified in the depth jump which is illustrative of the shock method. Since its inception in the former Soviet Union as the shock method, there have been other forms of the plyometric exercises created by Yessis that do not involve jump exercises. For details and illustrations of these exercises see "Explosive Running" and "Explosive Plyometrics". These exercises involve the stretch-shorten concept that underlies the shock method.

== Exercises ==
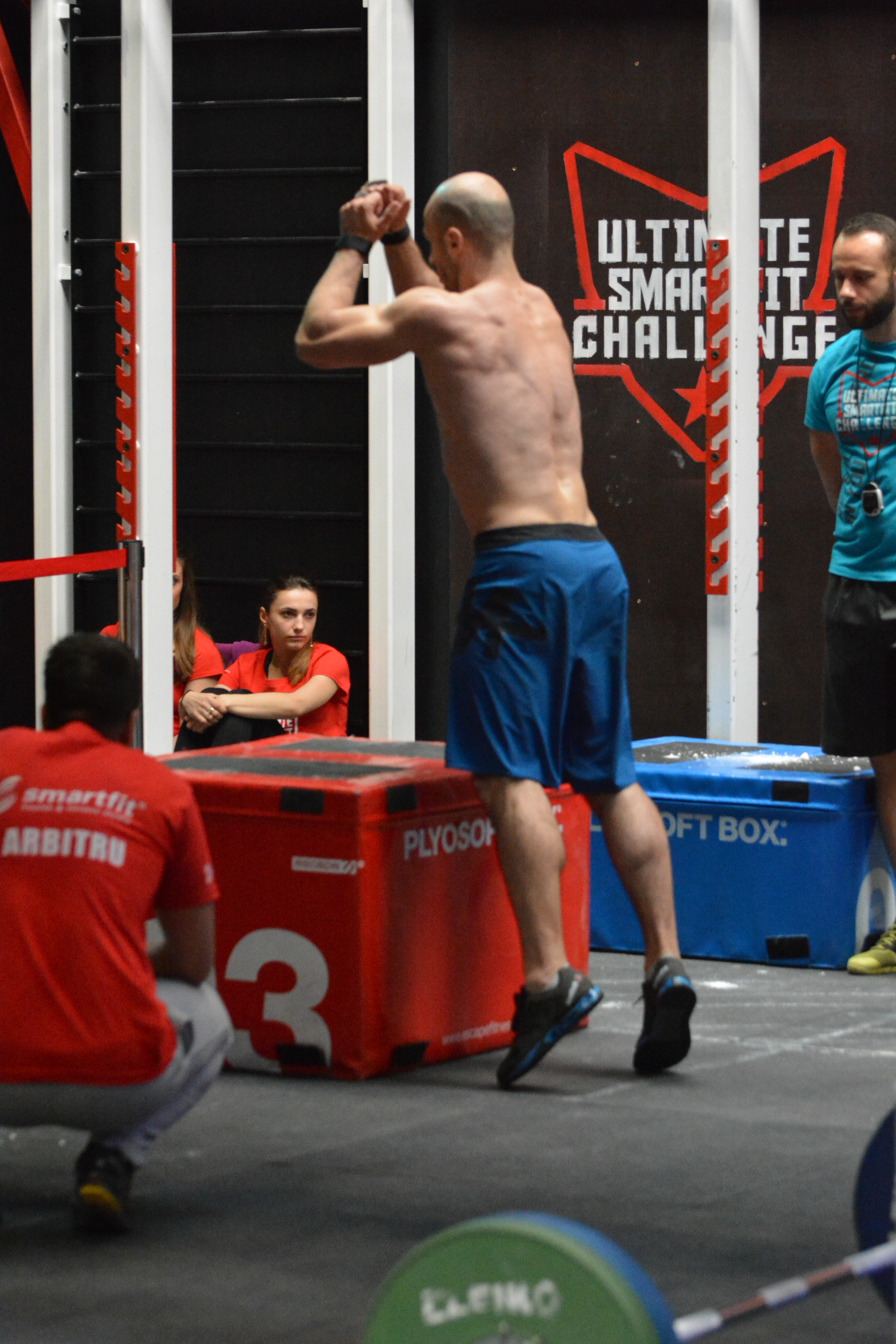
A box jump onto a plyometric box

=== Lower-body ===
- Squat jump (jumping squat, jump squat): combination of jump (not to be confused with tuck jump) and squat. Squat down then jump off the ground as high as possible, with extended and vertical legs.
- Tuck jump (tucked jump, tucked knee jump): with feet shoulder width apart, jump, tuck the legs in, extend them, and land.
- Tuck squat jump: combination of tuck jump and squat jump. Squat down, jump, bring knees up before landing again.
- Lateral jump: from a standing position, jump side to side.
- Single-leg hops / bounds: explosively jumping forward or laterally using one leg at a time, focusing on balance, power, and landing control.
- Alternate leg bounding: run with long strides, placing emphasis on hang time.
- Box jumps: jump onto and off of a large box 45 cm or higher.
- Vertical depth jump: starting from the top of a box, jump down and back up as fast as possible.
- Broad jump (long jump).
- Pike jump.
- Frog jumps: squat, place your hands on the floor, and jump forward explosively as far as possible, landing softly and immediately preparing for the next jump.
- Straddle jump (similar to split jumps used by dancers, gymnasts and figure skaters).
- Lunge jump

=== Upper-body ===
- Plyometric push-up (plyo push-up): perform a push up, but exert enough upward force to lift the hands and body off the ground.
- Medicine ball chest pass: hold a medicine ball at chest level and explosively throw it forward using both hands, extending the arms rapidly as in a basketball chest pass.
- Medicine ball cross slams (one-arm diagonal slam): Hold the medicine ball in one hand, raise it overhead on one side, then explosively rotate the torso and hips to slam it diagonally across the body toward the ground.
- Medicine ball slams: lift the medicine ball overhead and forcefully slam it straight down to the ground, engaging the core, shoulders, and arms.
- Switch-ups (explosive pull-up/chin-up variations): An advanced plyometric exercise in which one uses alternating grips on a bar to perform a pull-up / chin-up, and at the top, explosively switches the grip or hand position before lowering. This heavily engages the shoulders, but is regarded comparatively safer to a muscle-up.

=== Full-body ===
- Power skipping: On each skip, lift the upper leg as high as possible while driving the opposite arm upward to maximize stride height and explosive leg drive.
- Burpee jumps: from a standing position, drop into a squat, kick your feet back into a plank, perform a push-up, return to squat, and explosively jump upward. Due to pauses and multiple phases that reduce SCS effectiveness, burpees are not considered pure plyometric exercises. They contribute more to muscular endurance and general conditioning than to maximal force or power development.
- Burpee broad jumps: An advanced variation of the standard burpee, closer to a pure plyometric because it emphasizes rapid SSC use. It's like a standard burpee, but instead of jumping straight up, explosively leap forward as far as possible, land softly and immediately prepare for the next repetition.
- Bounding: run with exaggerated, powerful strides, pushing off each leg forcefully and focus to maximize both forward distance and hang time.
- Jump rope: Repeatedly skipping over a rope with knees slightly bent, engages the stretch-shortening cycle of leg muscles with each jump, making it a form of low intensity plyometrics.

== Method ==
In the depth jumps, the athlete experiences a shock on landing in which the hip, knee, and ankle extensor muscles undergo a powerful eccentric contraction. For the muscles to respond explosively, the eccentric contraction is then quickly switched to the isometric (when the downward movement stops) and then the concentric contraction, in a minimum amount of time. This allows the athlete to jump upward as high as possible.

In the eccentric contraction, the muscles are involuntarily lengthened, while in the concentric contraction, the muscles are shortened after being tensed. Most of the stretching and shortening takes place in the tendons that attach to the muscles involved rather than in the muscles. To execute the depth jump, the athlete stands on a raised platform, usually not greater than 50–75 centimetres (20–30 in) high, and then steps out and drops down in a vertical pathway to make contact with the floor. The height used by most athletes is usually quite low in the early stages of training. The key is how high the athlete jumps in relation to the height of the takeoff platform. Technique and jump height are most important at this time. While the body is dropping, the athlete consciously prepares the muscles for the impact by tensing the muscles. The flooring upon which the athlete drops down on should be somewhat resilient, mainly for prevention of injury. Upon making contact with the floor, the athlete then goes into slight leg flex to absorb some of the force for safety. However, the main role played by the muscles and tendons is to withstand the force that is experienced in the landing. This force is withstood in eccentric contraction. When muscle contraction is sufficiently great, it is able to stop the downward movement very quickly.

This phase is sometimes called the phase of amortization in which the athlete absorbs some of the force and stops downward movement by the strong eccentric contraction of the muscles. The strong eccentric contraction prepares the muscles to switch to the concentric contraction in an explosive manner for takeoff.

When the athlete drops down to the floor, the body experiences an impact upon landing. The higher the height of the step-off platform, the greater the impact force upon landing. This creates a shock to the body which the body responds to by undergoing a strong involuntary muscular contraction to prevent the body from collapsing on the ground. This in turn produces great tension in the muscles and tendons which is then given back in a return upward movement. The faster the change in the muscular contractions, the greater the power created and the resulting height attained.

More specifically, the muscles and tendons undergo a stretch (eccentric contraction) while landing which is needed to absorb some of the force generated but most importantly, to withstand the force that is produced by the shock that occurs on the landing. The greater the shock (forces experienced on landing), the stronger the eccentric contraction will be, which in turn produces even greater tension. This tension, which is potential force, is then given back in the return movement when the muscular contractions switch to the concentric or shortening regime.

However, for maximum return of energy, minimum time must elapse from when the force is received to when they are returned. The greater the time between receiving the forces and giving them back, the less is the return and the less the height that can be achieved in the jump. Most of the lengthening and shortening occurs in the respective muscle tendons which have greater elasticity.

Another way of saying this is that the faster the switching from the eccentric to the concentric contraction, the greater will be the force produced and the greater the return movement. The speed of the switching is extremely fast, 0.20 seconds or less. For example, high-level sprinters execute the switch from the eccentric contraction that occurs when the foot hits the ground to the concentric contraction when the foot breaks contact with the ground in less than 0.10 seconds. In world-class sprinters, the time is approximately 0.08 seconds. The exact platform height used by most athletes in the depth jump should be less than 75 centimetres (30 in) in the early stages of training. Most athletes start at approximately 30 centimetres (12 in) after doing some jump training. They then gradually work up to 50 centimetres (20 in) and then to 75 cm depending upon how well the jumps are executed. The main criterion is that the athlete is jumping as high as possible on every jump.

If the athlete gradually improves his jump height, the same platform height is continued until increases in jump height are no longer observed. At this time, takeoff height is increased by a few inches. If the athlete continually fails to jump very high, the height of the drop-down is lowered somewhat. Most important here is how high the athlete jumps after the drop-down.

The maximum platform height used by a high level athlete is no more than 100 centimetres (40 in). Rather than developing greater explosive power this height leads to more eccentric strength development. Going higher than 75 centimetres (30 in) is usually counterproductive and may lead to injury. This occurs when the intensity of the forced involuntary eccentric contraction upon landing is greater than the muscles can withstand. In addition, the athlete will not be able to execute a quick return (fast transition between muscular contractions), which is the key to successful execution of explosive plyometrics.

Because of the forces involved and the quickness of execution, the central nervous system is strongly involved. It is important that the athlete not overdo using the shock plyometric method. Doing so will lead to great fatigue, and, according to Verkhoshansky, sleep disturbances. Athletes have great difficulty sleeping well if they execute too many depth jumps. This indicates that athletes must be well-prepared physically before doing this type of training.

Technique of jumping is also very important when executing plyometric exercises. In essence, the athlete goes into a slight squat (crouch) upon landing in which the hip, knee, and ankle joints flex. The takeoff or jump upward is executed in a sequence initiated by hip-joint extension followed by knee-joint extension which begins during the hip-joint extension. As the knee-joint extension is taking place, ankle-joint extension begins and is the only action that occurs as the takeoff (breaking contact with the ground) takes place. All three actions contribute force to the upward jump, but the knee-joint extension is the major contributor.

== As simple jumping ==
The most common type of plyometrics used in the United States is simple and relatively easy jump exercises executed with little regard to execution time. These jumps are effective for athletes who execute skills in their sport that do not require explosive type muscular contractions. An example is long-distance running in which the runners execute repeat actions of 20 to 30 consecutive jumps and other cyclic-type activities such as leaping for multiple repetitions.

Such plyometric jumps are also used as a warm-up for doing explosive plyometric jumps and for initial preparation of the muscles prior to undertaking exercises such as depth jumps. In essence, they are effective in the early stages of learning how to do plyometric exercises and for preparing the muscles for explosive or quick jumps. These jumps are similar to those done by youngsters in the playground or in neighborhood games and as such, do not require additional preparation. Athletes, regardless of their level of expertise, can undertake such jumps in the initial stages of training.

When athletes who have been doing plyometrics without regard to time of execution first attempt to execute explosive plyometrics, they often fail because the time of execution is too long. This occurs quite often in the depth jump. The athlete usually sinks (drops) too low which takes too long to make the transition from the eccentric to the concentric contraction. As a result, the exercise becomes a jump-strength exercise and not a true plyometric one.

Jump technique remains the same regardless of whether it is a true plyometric exercise or a jump exercise. The hips, knees, and ankles flex when landing and the joints extend on the upward return. The sequence and overlapping in the sequence is basically the same, beginning with the hip extension, followed by knee extension, and ending with the ankle-plantar flexing. The major differences in execution are the depth of the landing and the time of executing the switch from the eccentric to the concentric contraction.

Studies have been conducted testing ten various plyometric exercises on overall performance during jumping examined by EMG, power, and ground reaction force (GRF). Of the ten exercises, the single-leg cone hops, box jumps, tuck jumps, and two-legged vertical jumps produced the highest EMG values, alluding to greater motor recruitment. Power was examined in dumbbell jumps, depth jumps, countermovement jumps, squat jumps, and tuck jumps which all produced the higher power scale readings. In terms of athletic performance and training, the plyometric movements that utilize total body vibration produced an overall increase in performance output. A recent study examined two groups using the same plyometric protocol in combination with weight training, one using high loads and the other utilizing small loads, and similar decreases in power were found. This shows that the plyometric exercises themselves had a greater effect in the decrease in power output rather than the type of weight training.

== Safety considerations ==
Plyometrics have been shown to have benefits for reducing lower extremity injuries in team sports while combined with other neuromuscular training (i.e. strength training, balance training, and stretching). Plyometric exercises involve an increased risk of injury due to the large force generated during training and performance, and should only be performed by well conditioned individuals under supervision. A 2026 study demonstrated that integrating a 6-week land-based plyometric training program significantly reduces lower limb injury incidence and improves agility in competitive basketball players compared to regular training alone. Good levels of physical strength, flexibility, and proprioception should be achieved before beginning plyometric training.

The specified minimum strength requirement varies depending on where the information is sourced and the intensity of the plyometrics being performed. Chu (1998) recommends that a participant be able to perform 50 repetitions of the squat exercise at 60% of his or her body weight before doing plyometrics. Core (abdomen) strength is also important.

Flexibility is required both for injury prevention and to enhance the effect of the stretch shortening cycle. Some advanced training methods combine plyometrics and intensive stretching in order to both protect the joint and make it more receptive to the plyometric benefits.

Proprioception is an important component of balance, coordination and agility, which is also required for safe performance of plyometric exercises.

Further safety considerations include:

- Age: should be taken into account for both prepubescent and the elderly because of hormonal changes.
- Technique: a participant must be instructed on proper technique before commencing any plyometric exercise. He or she should be well rested and free of injury in any of the limbs to be exercised.

Plyometrics are not inherently dangerous, but the highly focused and intense movements used in repetition increase the potential level of stress on joints and musculo-tendonous units. Therefore, safety precautions are strong prerequisites to this particular method of exercise. Low-intensity variations of plyometrics are frequently utilized in various stages of injury rehabilitation, indicating that the application of proper technique and appropriate safety precautions can make plyometrics safe and effective for many people.

== Benefits ==
Many professional and Olympic athletes use plyometric training to improve muscular strength, power, and jumping performance. Plyometric exercises can be performed at varying levels of intensity, allowing adaptation to different training needs. Studies have also reported associations between plyometric training and improvements in muscular strength, endurance, metabolic rate, and cardiovascular responses.

As plyometrics places high mechanical loads transmitting through the bones, they stimulate bone remodelling and increase bone mineral density (BMD). A one year randomized clinical trial of moderately active men with low bone density reported that high intensity plyometric jump training had increased lumbar spine and whole body BMD.

== Variations ==
There are numerous different forms of plyometrics which can be practiced in isolation or in combination with each other. They include:

Maximal plyometrics, also known as classic plyometrics, involve jumps which are designed so that the influence of the stretch-shortening cycle is maximised and maximum power can be generated as a result. For example, a drop from a short height can mean that a subsequent jump can be performed more powerfully than if there had been no drop. An early Soviet researcher of plyometrics, Dr. Yuri Verkhoshansky, stated that the optimum drop height to achieve maximum jumping power from was 1.1 metres.

Serial plyometrics involve jumping repeatedly in a given direction. For example, repeatedly leaping forwards taking off from one or both feet.

Lateral plyometrics involve jumping sideways either continuing in the same direction or reversing the direction.

Rotational plyometrics involve rotating during the jump. For example, facing forwards and then jumping to the right while rotating 90 degrees to also face in that direction.

Combination plyometrics involve combining a jump with another action. For example, taking a lunge forwards and then exploding upwards into a vertical jump, or jumping and throwing a medicine ball while in flight.

Rhythmic plyometrics are either a continuous series of the same plyometric action or a sequence of different actions. The emphasis is on intuitively feeling the rhythm of the movements in order to aid performance.

=== Loaded plyometrics ===
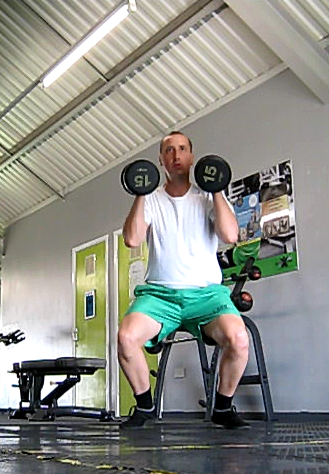
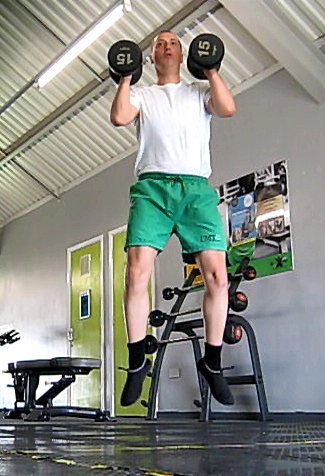
A vertical jump with two 15kg dumbbells held just above the shoulders.

Plyometric exercises are sometimes performed with an additional load, or weight added. In such cases, they are referred to as loaded plyometrics or weighted jumps. The weight is held or worn. It may be in the form of a barbell, trap bar, dumbbells, or weighted vest. For instance, a vertical jump whilst holding a trap bar or jumping split squats whilst holding dumbbells. In addition, a regular weight lifting exercise is sometimes given a plyometric component, such as is found in a loaded jump squat. Jumping onto plyo boxes or over hurdles whilst holding weights is not recommended for safety reasons. The advantage of loaded plyometric exercises is that they increase the overall force with which the exercise is performed. This can enhance the positive effect of the exercise and further increase the practitioner's ability to apply explosive power.

=== Unilateral plyometrics ===
Unilateral plyometrics are jumping exercises which involve only one foot being in contact with the ground at some stage. This can include jumping off of, and landing on, the same foot i.e. hopping, jumping from one foot and then landing on the other, jumping from one foot and landing on two, or jumping off two and landing on one. It typically makes more intense demands on the legs than bilateral plyometric training and can be used to further enhance explosive power. The intensity of the exercises can be manipulated through the adjusting of box and hurdle height, and any weight which is held or worn. The greatest intensity can be achieved whereby the height or the distance travelled is maximized.

A hop test involves a comparison between the hopping height or distance achievable by the left and right legs, considered separately. It is used to assess the relative strength levels of each leg and whether there is a muscle imbalance i.e. a strength discrepancy between the left and right sides which results in a significant variation in the results. If such an imbalance is found, unilateral plyometrics may be used to alleviate it. As the legs are used singly, and perform the same amount of work, the body and legs may be strengthened more evenly than bilateral plyometrics, which may involve one leg doing an excessively large amount of the work.

Some forms of unilateral plyometrics involve a cyclic alternation between the legs e.g. repeatedly jumping from one foot to the other. As runners perform a similar action of alternating between left and right legs, and each step has an acceleration phase like a jump does, then based upon this commonality, such unilateral plyometrics are considered to transfer effectively to running and sprinting and improve performance.

== See also ==
- Ballistic training
- Calisthenics
- Complex training
- Parkour
- Power training
- Strength training
- Unilateral training
