= Split leap =

An acro dancer performing a straddle split leap.

A split leap or split jump is a sequence of body movements in which a person assumes a split position after leaping or jumping from the floor, respectively, while still in the air. Split leaps and split jumps are both found in various genres of dance including acro, ballet and jazz dance, and in gymnastics. Split jumps may also serve as a form of exercise, and the term split jump is also commonly used to describe similar body movements in figure skating.

== Types ==
Some types of split leaps and jumps are named according to the type of split that is performed, while others may use nomenclature associated with specific dance genres. For example, a straddle (sometimes called side) split leap incorporates a straddle split, with legs extended symmetrically to the sides, whereas a grand jeté, which involves a front split, derives its name from ballet terminology. A stag split leap is a split leap in which one knee is bent, whereas both knees are bent in a double stag split leap.

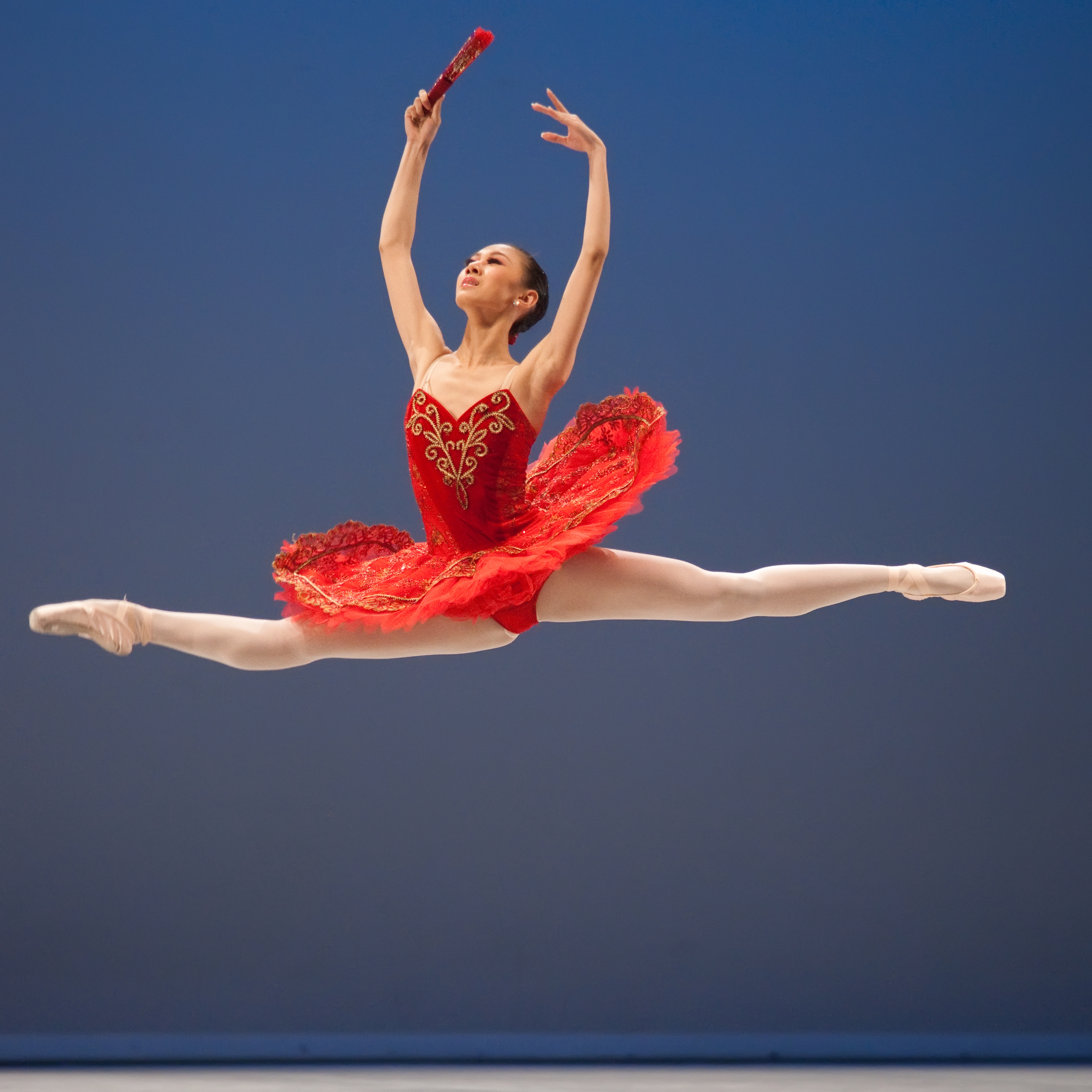
A ballerina performing a grand jeté.

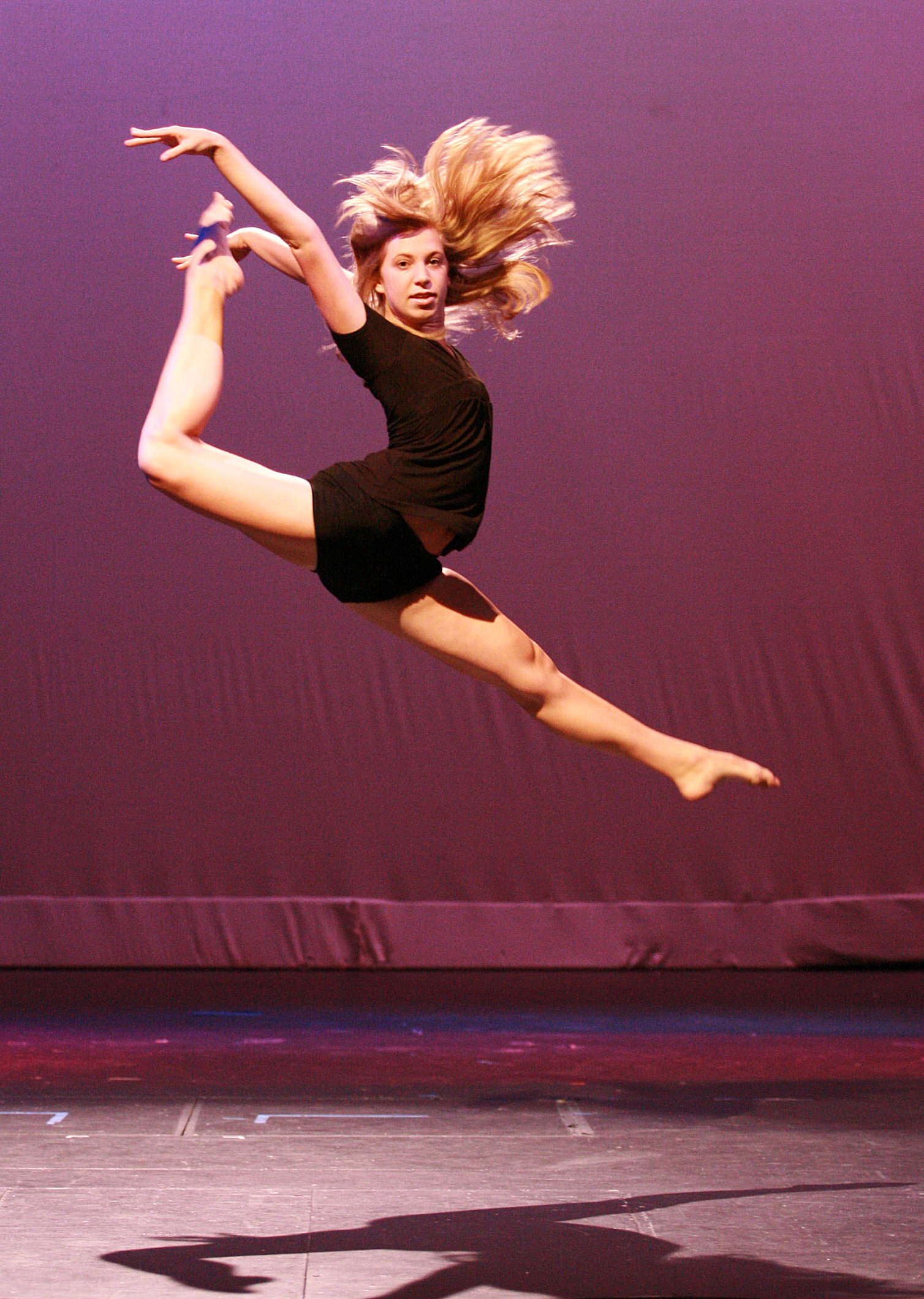
Stag split leap.

== Technique ==
Split leaps and split jumps require significant flexibility and strength. Flexibility and strength are both needed to attain a split position without the aid of external leg support. Also, in order to remain airborne while in the split position, strength is needed to propel the body upward with sufficient kinetic energy to compensate for the loss of vertical momentum that results from raising the legs into a split position while airborne.

In dance, the perceived quality of a split leap or split jump depends in large part on the application of various dance techniques. In particular, emphasis is often placed on pointing the feet while airborne, especially during the split, so as to extend the leg lines. Also, proper technique (i.e., best practice) typically calls for straight legs (except in stag variations) and a full split position at the apex of the leap or jump. Ballon, which is the appearance of effortless and weightless movement, is another important aesthetic.

== Ballet ==
In ballet the leap, called a grand jeté in ballet terminology begins with a grand battement. Ballet demands that knees are stretched and feet are pointed when performing the jump. One variation of the jump colloquially called the "Plisetakaya head kick" after Bolshoi prima ballerina assoluta Maya Plisetskaya is a jump with the front leg tilted downward and a full backbend.

== See also ==
- Split jump (figure skating)
- Split jump (exercise)
