= Hanumanasana =

Seated posture in hatha yoga

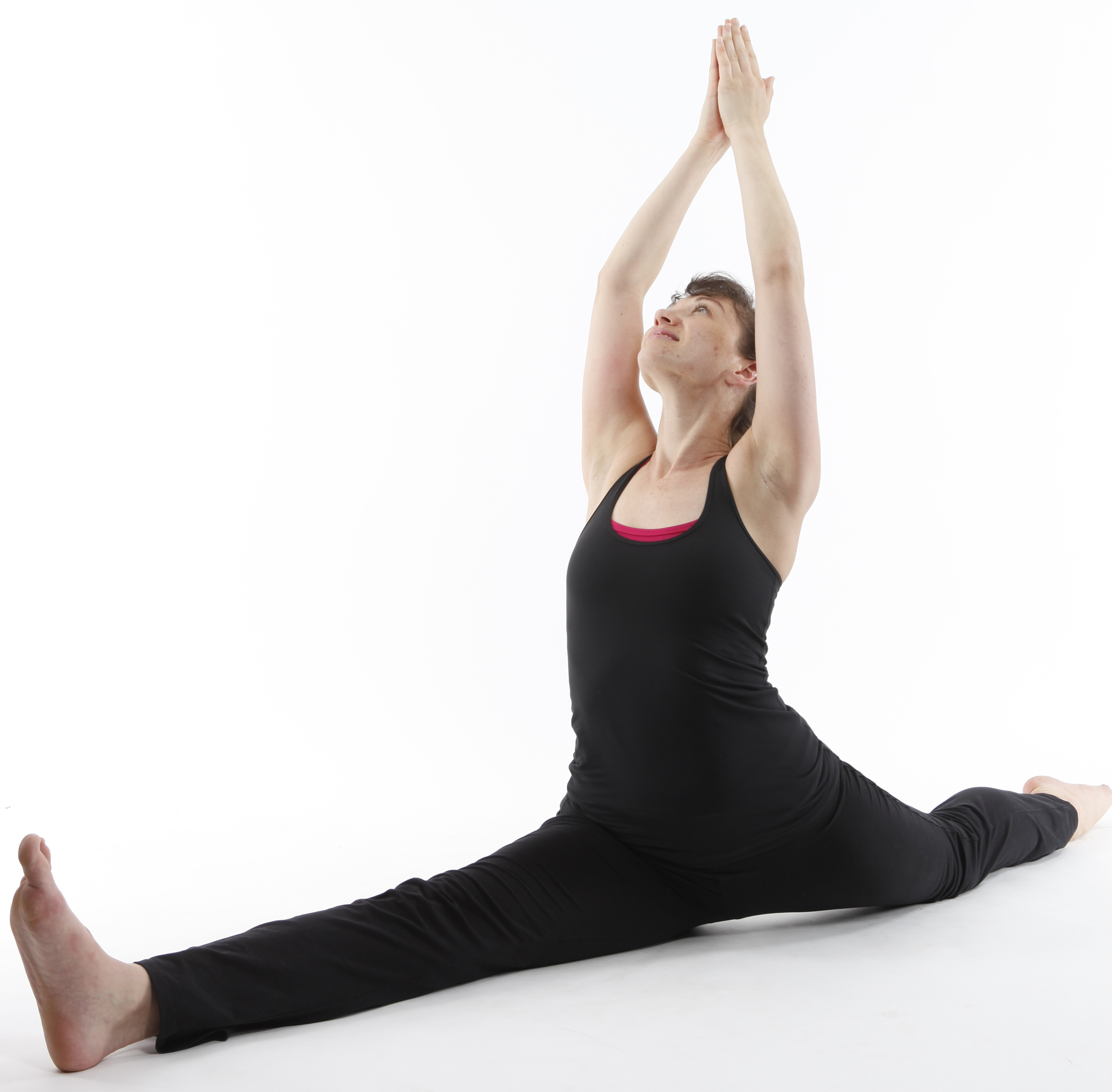
Hanumanasana from 3/4 view

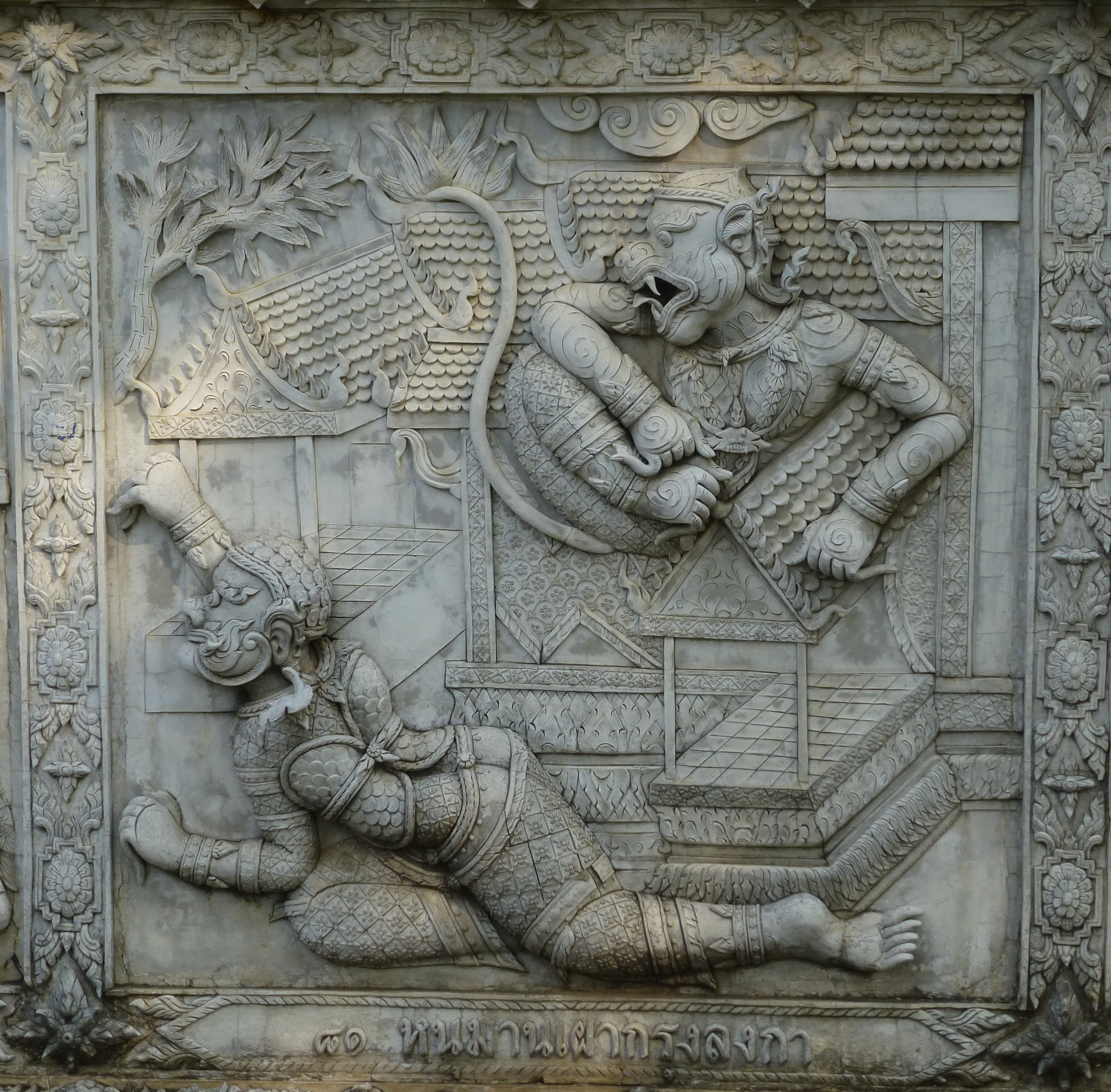
Hanuman sets Lanka on Fire, at Wat Phananchoeng, Ayutthaya

Hanumanasana (Sanskrit: हनुमानासन) or Monkey Pose is a seated asana in modern yoga as exercise. It is the yoga version of the front splits.

== Etymology and origins ==
The name comes from the name Hanuman (a Hindu god who resembles a monkey) and the Sanskrit word asana (posture). The pose commemorates the giant leap made by Hanuman to reach Lanka from the mainland of India.

The pose is not described in the medieval hatha yoga texts. It appears in the 20th century in diverse traditions of modern yoga, such as in Swami Yogesvarananda's 1970 First Steps to Higher Yoga (as Vikatasana), in the Ashtanga (vinyasa) yoga of Pattabhi Jois, in Swami Satyananda Saraswati's 2003 Asana Pranayama Mudra Bandha, and in B. K. S. Iyengar's 1966 Light on Yoga.

== Description ==
Hanumanasana is an advanced pose (rated 36 out of 64 by B. K. S. Iyengar). The pose is approached from a kneeling position, stretching one leg forward and the other straight back while supporting the body with the hands until the full pose is mastered. The hands may then be placed in prayer position (Anjali Mudra). Finally, the arms may be stretched above the head, and the palms joined together. Iyengar states that to reach the full pose, one must make "several attempts each day" and be prepared to work at it for "a long time".

A preparatory pose is the low lunge, Anjaneyasana; this aligns the legs as required for the advanced split.

Anjaneyasana as a preparatory pose, showing the similar leg alignment

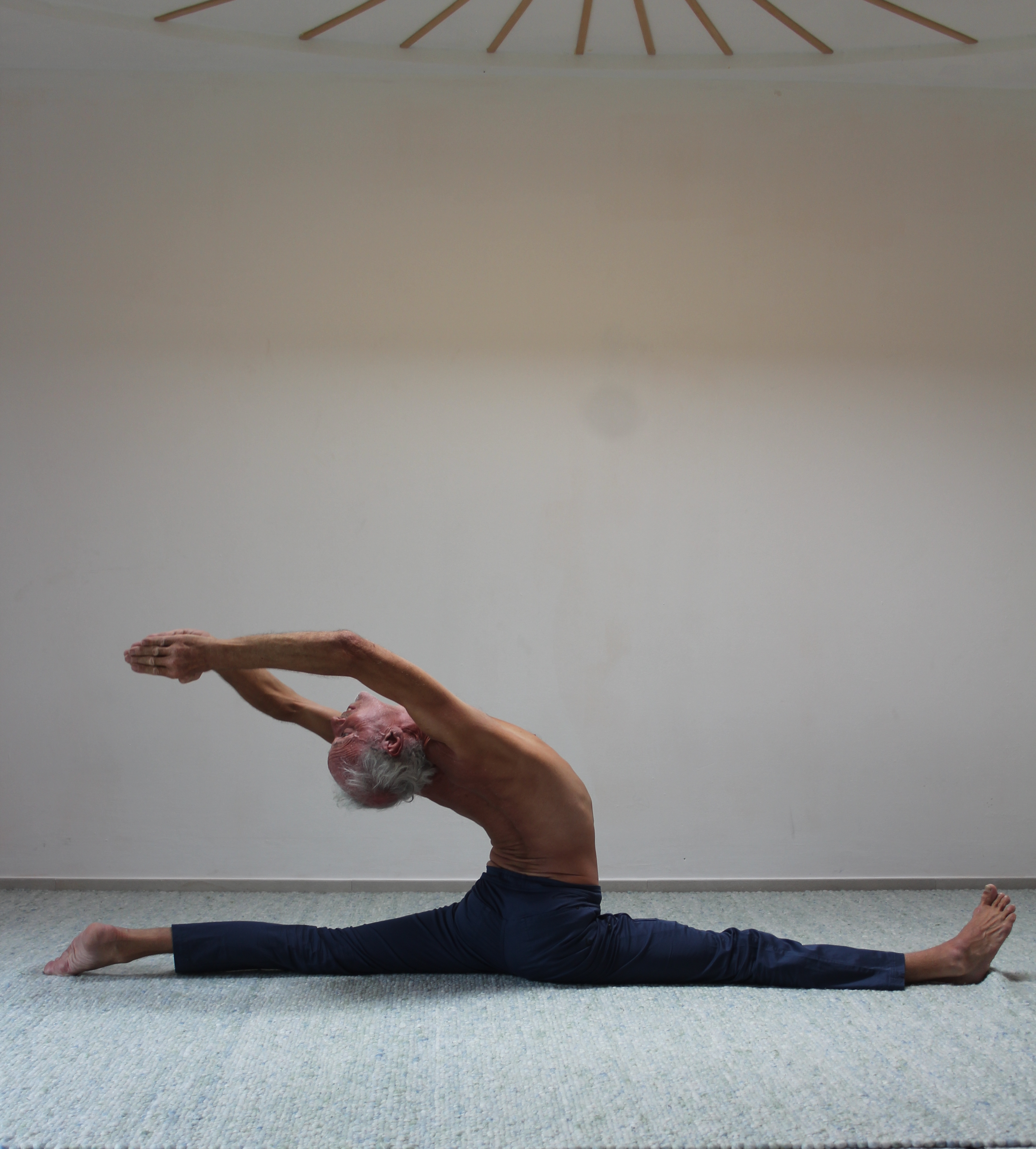
With a deep backbend

== See also ==
- Samakonasana, the yoga form of side splits
