= Split jump (exercise) =

Physical jumping exercise

A split jump (also known as lunge jump, jumping lunge, plyometric lunge or simply plyo lunge. Not to be confused with the split jump used by dancers, gymnasts and figure skaters) is a form of exercise which focuses on the upper leg muscles, especially the quadriceps:

1. assume an upright squatting position with one foot forward and the other back
2. with a jumping motion, simultaneously move the rear foot forward and the front foot back, ending as position 1 with the feet reversed
3. repeat

The exercise is often used for increasing lower body strength and overall athleticism.

== See also ==
- Split Jack
- Flexibility (anatomy)
- Grand jeté
- Split (gymnastics)
- Split jump
- Split leap
- Squat (exercise)
