= Split jump =

Jumps in figure skating

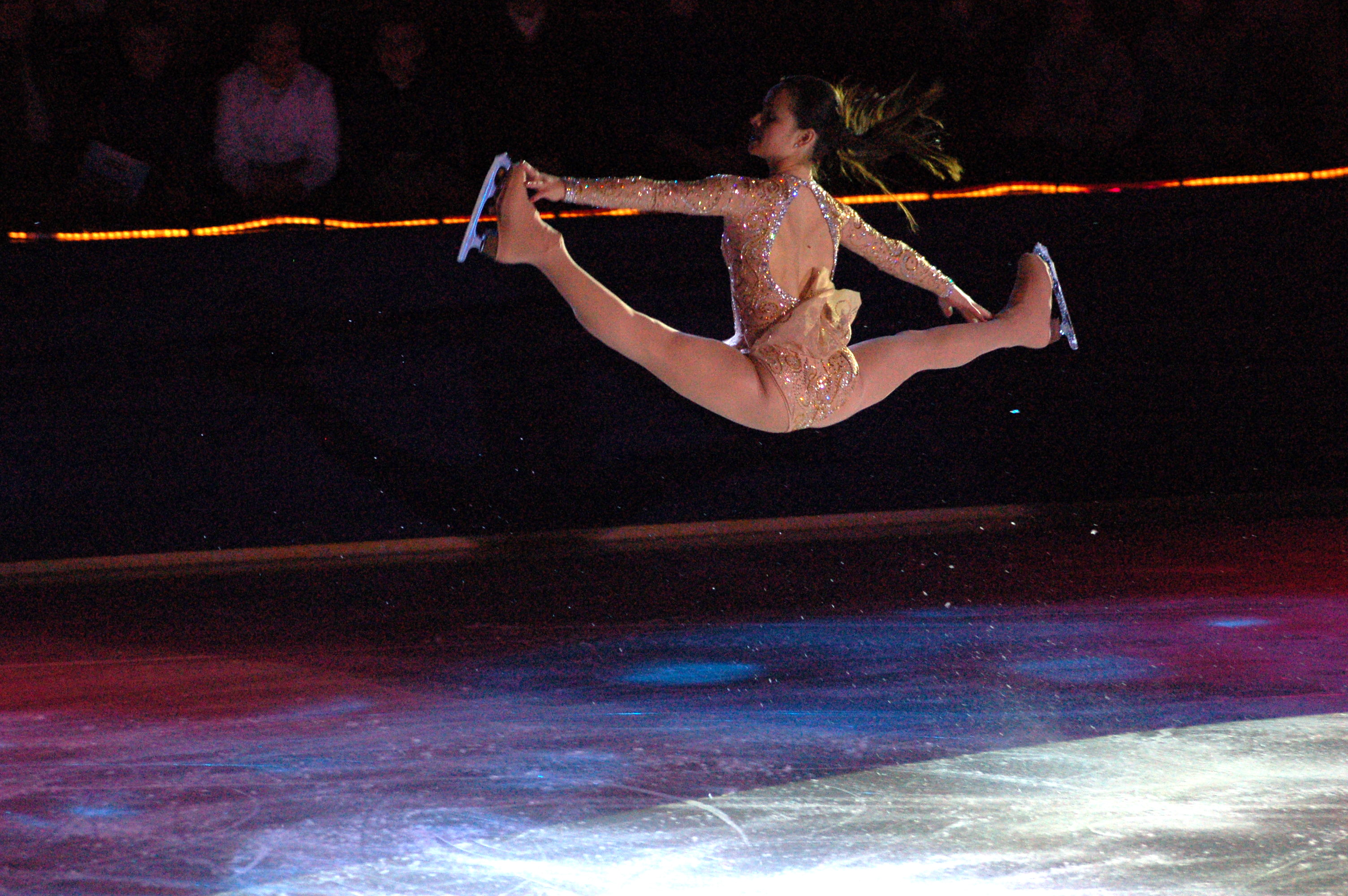
Sasha Cohen performs a Russian split jump

A split jump is a sequence of body movements in which a split is performed after jumping, while the performer is still in the air. Split jumps are commonly found in dance, figure skating, and gymnastics, and may also be used as a form of exercise.

== In figure skating ==
Split jumps are a category of figure skating jumps in which the skater achieves a split position in the air. Unlike most figure skating jumps, split jumps are positional jumps, rather than rotational jumps; the point of them is to achieve a position in the air, not to rotate a specific number of times.

Most split jumps are derived from the half flip, a half-rotation jump with a flip entry. Split jumps can also be done with half Lutz or falling leaf (a loop jump with a half-revolution in the air) entries. More rarely, full-rotation flip and Lutz jumps can be done with a split. These jumps are known as the split flip and split Lutz.

As an alternative to the standard front split, some skaters perform a Russian split, with legs in a straddle split. The only difference between this and a split jump is the position in the air. The legs extend straight out, with the toes pointed. Skaters often touch their toes as part of a Russian split.

Another variation is the stag jump, in which the forward leg is bent in front while the back leg kicks out as in the regular split jump. Both the Russian split and stag jump can be done from the same jump entries as the regular split jumps. Bending both legs in a stag jump is sometimes called a double stag jump.

Split jumps are non-listed composition jumps in figure skating, but they can be very dramatic when performed well. The challenge is for the skater to achieve a full horizontal split or straddle position at the apex of the jump, which requires both body flexibility and a strong spring into the air.

Mako Yamashita performs a split jump.

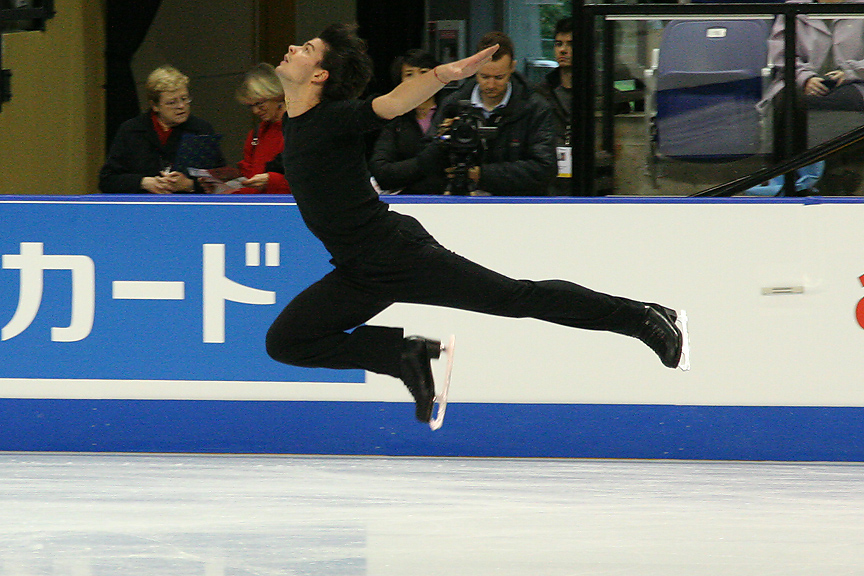
Stephane Lambiel performs a stag jump.

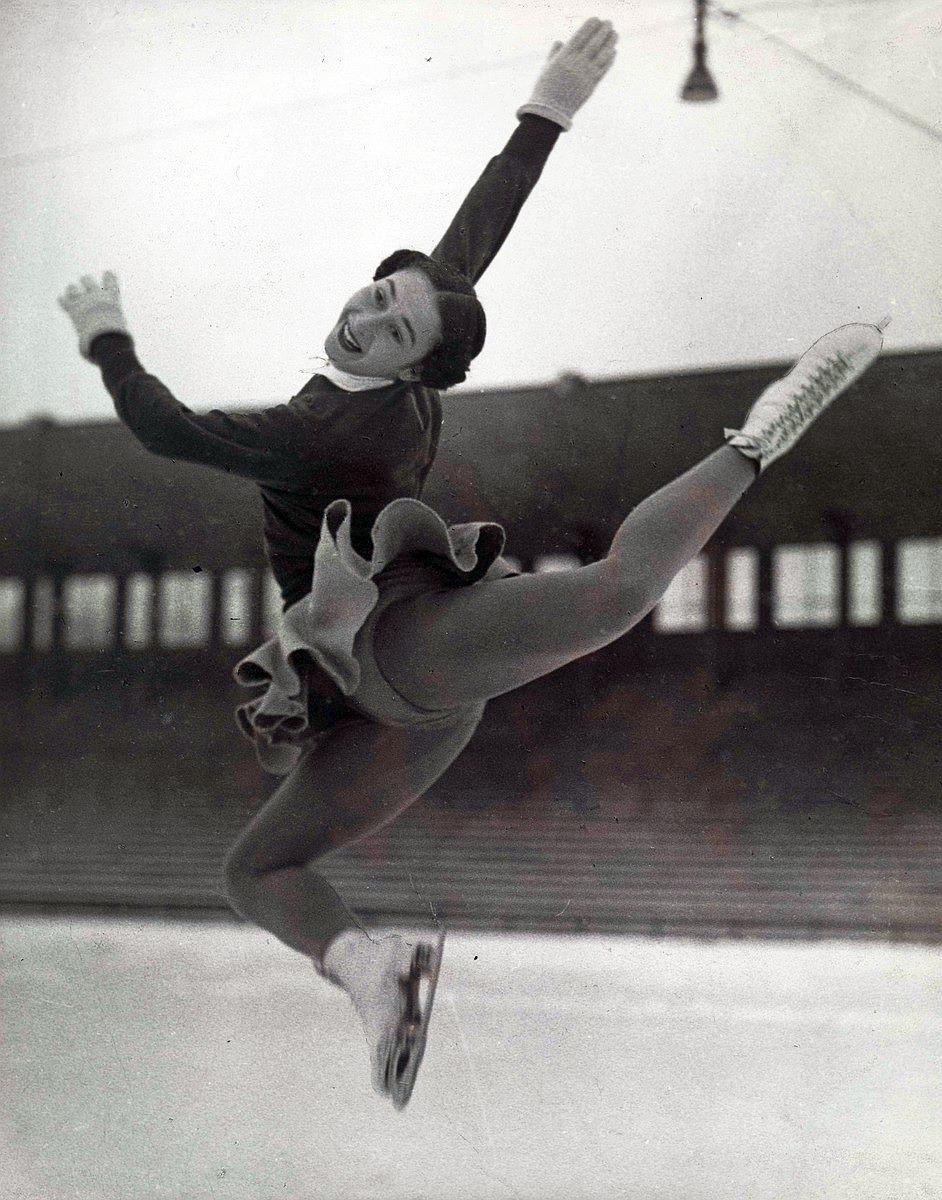
Jacqueline du Bief performs a double stag jump.

== See also ==
- Split leap
