= Stretch shortening cycle =

Muscle stretch followed by contraction

A stretch-shortening cycle (SSC) is a natural muscle function in which there is a rapid transitioning from an eccentric contraction (lengthening under load) to a concentric contraction (shortening) of the same muscle, storing elastic energy during the stretch and releasing it during the shortening. This process enhances force and power output, and make movements more explosive and efficient. This function is a primary principle in plyometrics, sprinting, jumping and throwing.

== Mechanics ==
The Stretch-shortening cycle (SSC) relies on a rapid transition from an eccentric phase to a concentric phase.

Eccentric phase (muscle lengthening under load): A phase when a muscle is lengthening while under tension or resisting a force and stretching at the same time. Examples include lowering into a squat, landing from a jump, and lowering chest in a push-up.

Concentric phase (muscle shortening): A phase when a muscle contracts and shortens to overcome resistance or produce movement. Examples include jumping upward from squat, pushing off the ground, pushing chest away in a push-up.

Rapid transition: The transition from an eccentric contraction to a concentric contraction must be rapid, to allow elastic energy storage and release, to enhance force and power output.

== Research studies ==
The increased performance benefit associated with muscle contractions that take place during SSCs has been the focus of much research in order to determine the true nature of this enhancement. At present, there is some debate as to where and how this performance enhancement takes place. It has been postulated that elastic structures in series with the contractile component can store energy like a spring after being forcibly stretched. Since the length of the tendon increases due to the active stretch phase, if the series elastic component acts as a spring, it would therefore be storing more potential energy. This energy would be released as the tendon shortened. Thus, the recoil of the tendon during the shortening phase of the movement would result in a more efficient movement than one in which no energy had been stored.

However, other studies have found that removing portions of these series-elastic components (by way of tendon length reduction) had little effect on muscle performance.

Studies on turkeys have, nevertheless, shown that during SSC, a performance enhancement associated with elastic energy storage still takes place but it is thought that the aponeurosis could be a major source of energy storage. The contractile component itself has also been associated with the ability to increase contractile performance through muscle potentiation while other studies have found that this ability is quite limited and unable to account for such enhancements.

== Community agreement ==
The results of these often contradictory studies have been associated with improved efficiencies for human or animal movements such as counter-movement jumps and running. However it is still not established why and how this enhancement takes place. It is one of the underlying mechanisms of plyometric training.
