= Jumping =

Form of movement pushing against gravity

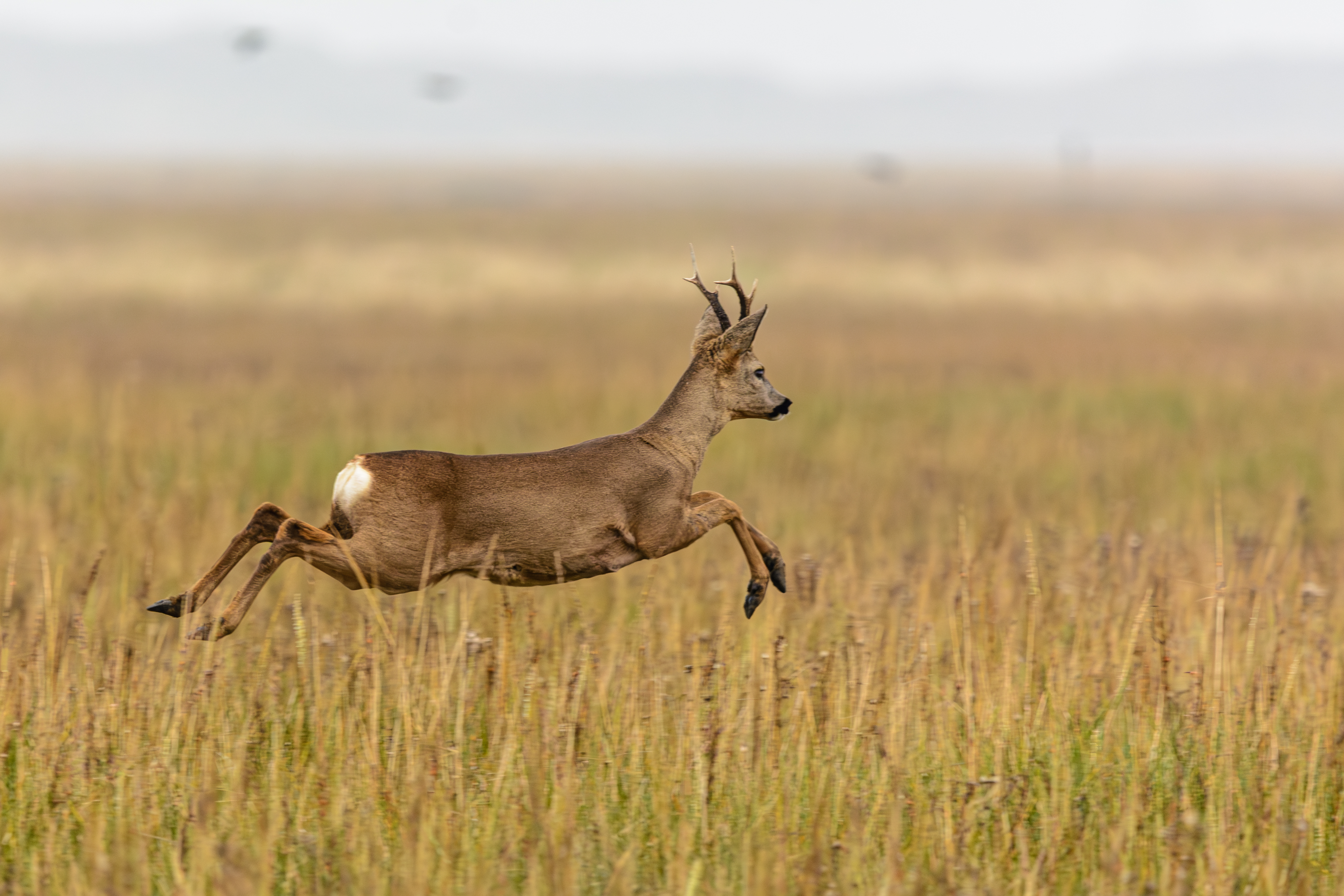
A roe deer jumping, Wadden Sea National Parks

Jumping or leaping is a form of locomotion or movement in which an organism or non-living (e.g., robotic) mechanical system propels itself through the air along a ballistic trajectory. Jumping can be distinguished from running, galloping and other gaits where the entire body is temporarily airborne by the relatively long duration of the aerial phase and high angle of initial launch.

Some animals, such as the kangaroo, employ jumping (commonly called hopping in this instance) as their primary form of an locomotion, while others, such as frogs, use it only as a means to escape predators. Jumping is also a key feature of various activities and sports, including the long jump, high jump and show jumping.

== Physics ==
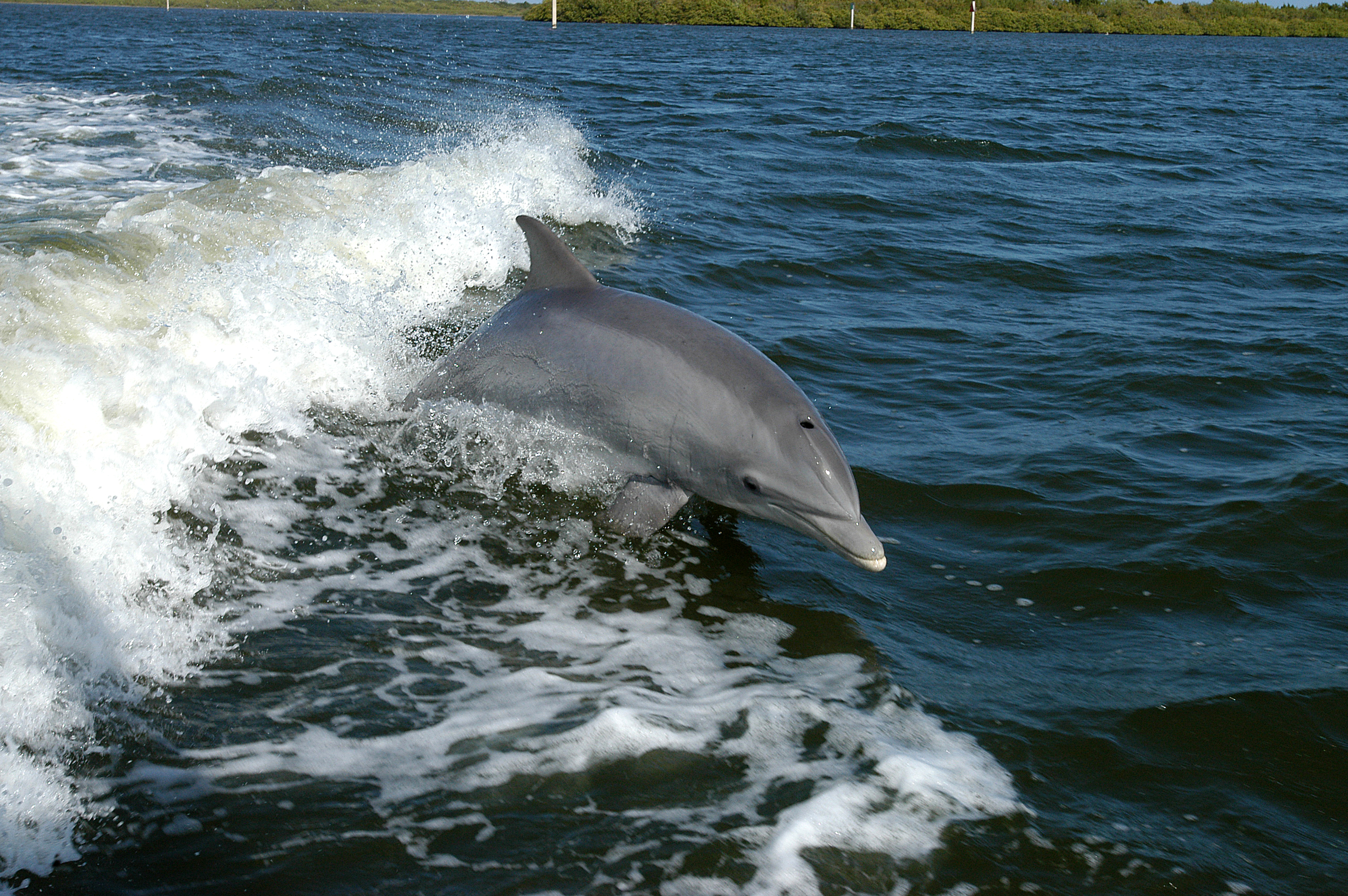
Jumping bottlenose dolphin

Jumping sea trout

All jumping involves the application of force against a substrate, which in turn generates a reactive force that propels the jumper away from the substrate. Any solid or liquid capable of producing an opposing force can serve as a substrate, including ground or water. Examples of the latter include dolphins performing traveling jumps, and Indian skitter frogs executing standing jumps from water.

Jumping organisms are rarely subject to significant aerodynamic forces and, as a result, their jumps are governed by the basic physical laws of ballistic trajectories. Consequently, while a bird may jump into the air to initiate flight, no movement it performs once airborne is considered jumping, as the initial jump conditions no longer dictate its flight path.

Following the moment of launch (i.e., initial loss of contact with the substrate), a jumper will traverse a parabolic path. The launch angle and initial launch velocity determine the travel distance, duration, and height of the jump. The maximum possible horizontal travel distance for a projectile occurs at a launch angle of 45°, but any launch angle between 35° and 55° will result in ninety percent of the maximum possible distance. However, the jump angle for humans which maximizes horizontal distance travelled is lower at ~23-26° (see section Standing long jump mechanics below).

A split leap executed by an acro dancer. This is one of several types of leaps found in dance.

Muscles (or other actuators in non-living systems) do physical work, adding kinetic energy to the jumper's body over the course of a jump's propulsive phase. This results in a kinetic energy at launch that is proportional to the square of the jumper's speed. The more work the muscles do, the greater the launch velocity and thus the greater the acceleration and the shorter the time interval of the jump's propulsive phase.

Mechanical power (work per unit time) and the distance over which that power is applied (e.g., leg length) are the key determinants of jump distance and height. As a result, many jumping animals have long legs and muscles that are optimized for maximal power according to the force-velocity relationship of muscles. The maximum power output of muscles is limited, however. To circumvent this limitation, many jumping species slowly pre-stretch elastic elements, such as tendons or apodemes, to store work as strain energy. Such elastic elements can release energy at a much higher rate (higher power) than equivalent muscle mass, thus increasing launch energy to levels beyond what muscle alone is capable of.

A jumper may be either stationary or moving when initiating a jump. In a jump from stationary (i.e., a standing jump), all of the work required to accelerate the body through launch is done in a single movement. In a moving jump or running jump, the jumper introduces additional vertical velocity at launch while conserving as much horizontal momentum as possible. Unlike stationary jumps, in which the jumper's kinetic energy at launch is solely due to the jump movement, moving jumps have a higher energy that results from the inclusion of the horizontal velocity preceding the jump. Consequently, jumpers are able to jump greater distances when starting from a run.

== Anatomy ==
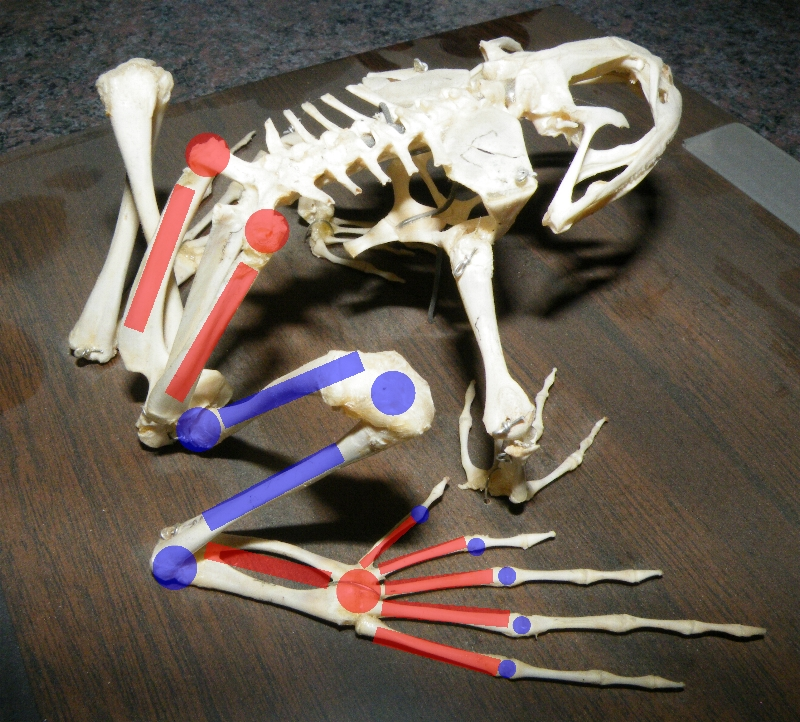
A bullfrog skeleton, showing elongate limb bones and extra joints. Red marks indicate bones substantially elongated in frogs, and joints that have become mobile. Blue indicates joints and bones that have not been modified, or are only somewhat elongated.

Animals use a wide variety of anatomical adaptations for jumping. These adaptations are exclusively concerned with the launch, as any post-launch method of extending range or controlling the jump must use aerodynamic forces, and thus is considered gliding or parachuting.

Aquatic species rarely display any particular specializations for jumping. Those that are good jumpers are primarily adapted for speed, and execute moving jumps by simply swimming to the surface at a high velocity. A few primarily aquatic species that can jump while on land, such as mud skippers, do so via a flick of the tail.

=== Limb morphology ===
In terrestrial animals, the primary propulsive structure is the legs, though a few species use their tails. Typical characteristics of jumping species include long legs, large leg muscles, and additional limb elements.

Long legs increase the time and distance over which a jumping animal can push against the substrate, thus allowing more power and faster, farther jumps. Large leg muscles can generate greater force, resulting in improved jumping performance. In addition to elongated leg elements, many jumping animals have modified foot and ankle bones that are elongated and possess additional joints, effectively adding more segments to the limb and even more length.

Frogs are an excellent example of all three trends: frog legs can be nearly twice the body length, leg muscles may account for up to twenty percent of body weight, and they have not only lengthened the foot, shin and thigh, but extended the ankle bones into another limb joint and similarly extended the hip bones and gained mobility at the sacrum for a second 'extra joint'. As a result, frogs are the undisputed champion jumpers of vertebrates, leaping over fifty body lengths, a distance of more than eight feet.

=== Power amplification through stored energy ===
Grasshoppers store energy for a jump, overcoming the limitations of muscle which cannot contract powerfully and quickly at the same time. Representations of structure are diagrammatic.

Grasshoppers use elastic energy storage to increase jumping distance. Although power output is a principal determinant of jump distance, physiological constraints limit muscle power to approximately 375 Watts per kilogram of muscle. To overcome this limitation, grasshoppers anchor their legs via an internal "catch mechanism" while their muscles stretch an elastic apodeme (similar to a vertebrate tendon). When the catch is released, the apodeme rapidly releases its energy. Because the apodeme releases energy more quickly than muscle, its power output far exceeds that of the muscle that produced the energy.

This is analogous to a human throwing an arrow by hand versus using a bow; the use of elastic storage (the bow) allows the muscles to operate closer to isometric on the force-velocity curve. This enables the muscles to do work over a longer time and thus produce more energy than they otherwise could, while the elastic element releases that work faster than the muscles can. The use of elastic energy storage has been found in jumping mammals as well as in frogs, with commensurate increases in power ranging from two to seven times that of equivalent muscle mass.

== Classification ==
One way to classify jumping is by the manner of foot transfer. In this classification system, five basic jump forms are distinguished:

- Jump – jumping from and landing on two feet
- Hop – jumping from one foot and landing on the same foot
- Leap – jumping from one foot and landing on the other foot
- Assemblé – jumping from one foot and landing on two feet
- Sissonne – jumping from two feet and landing on one foot

Leaping gaits, which are distinct from running gaits (see Locomotion), include cantering, galloping, and stotting or pronging. Some sources also distinguish bounding as a cyclical motion of repeated jumps, used to maintain energy from one jump to the next.

== Height-enhancing devices and techniques ==
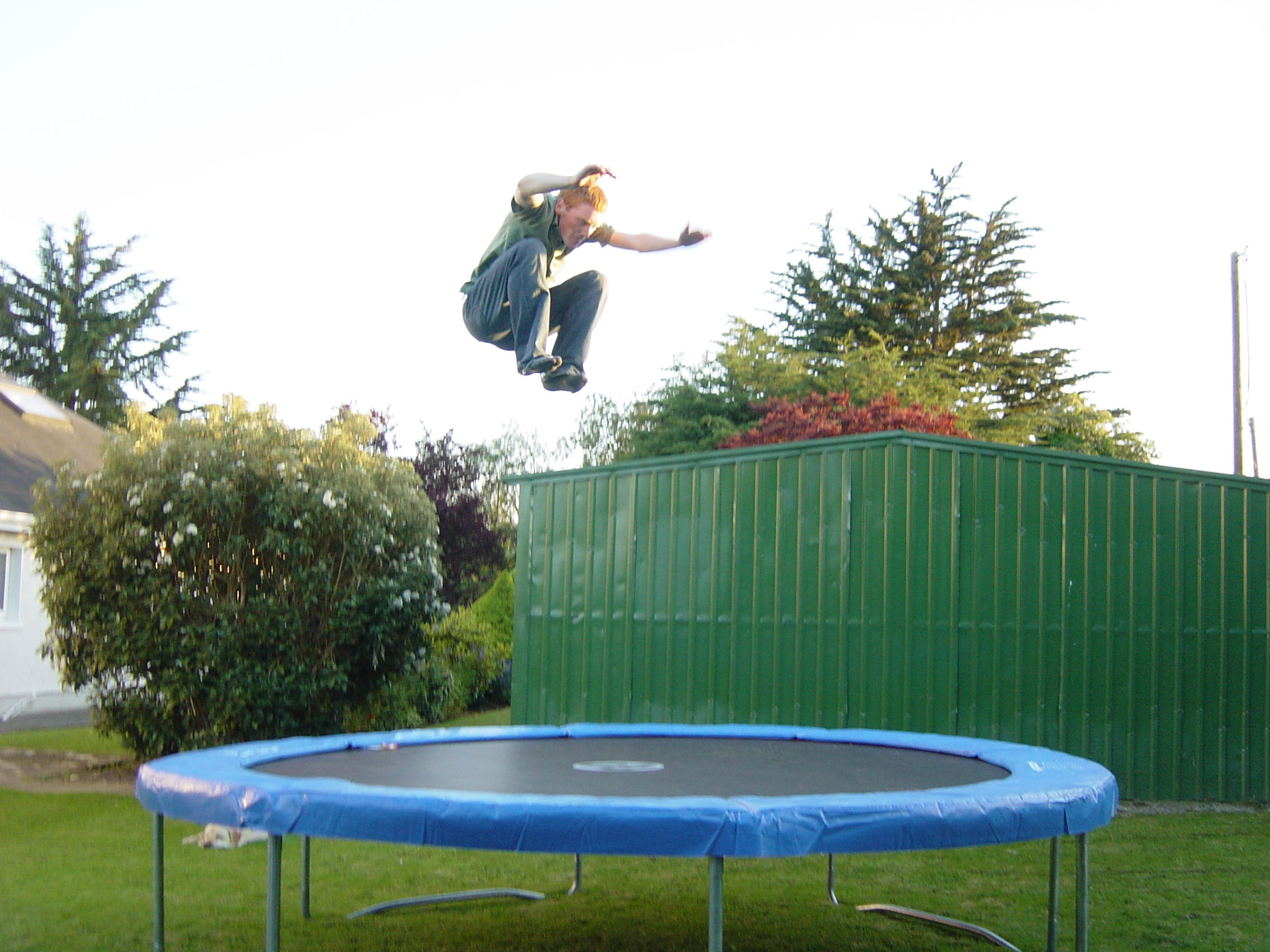
Person jumping on a trampoline

The height of a jump may be increased by using a trampoline or by converting horizontal velocity into vertical velocity with the aid of a device such as a half pipe.

Various exercises can be used to increase an athlete's vertical jumping height. One category of such exercises—plyometrics—employs repetition of discrete jumping-related movements to increase speed, agility, and power.

It has been shown in research that children who are more physically active display more proficient jumping (along with other basic motor skill) patterns.

It is also noted that jumping development in children has a direct relationship with age. As children grow older, it is seen that their jumping abilities in all forms also increase. Jumping development is more easily identifiable in children rather than adults due to the fact that there are less physical differences at a younger age. Adults of the same age may be vastly different in terms of physicality and athleticism making it difficult to see how age affects jumping ability.

In 2021, researchers incorporated ratchets into a robot design and created a robot capable of jumping over thirty meters vertically.

== See also ==
- List of jumping activities
