= Glossary of gymnastics terms =

This is a general glossary of the terms used in the sport of gymnastics.

== A ==
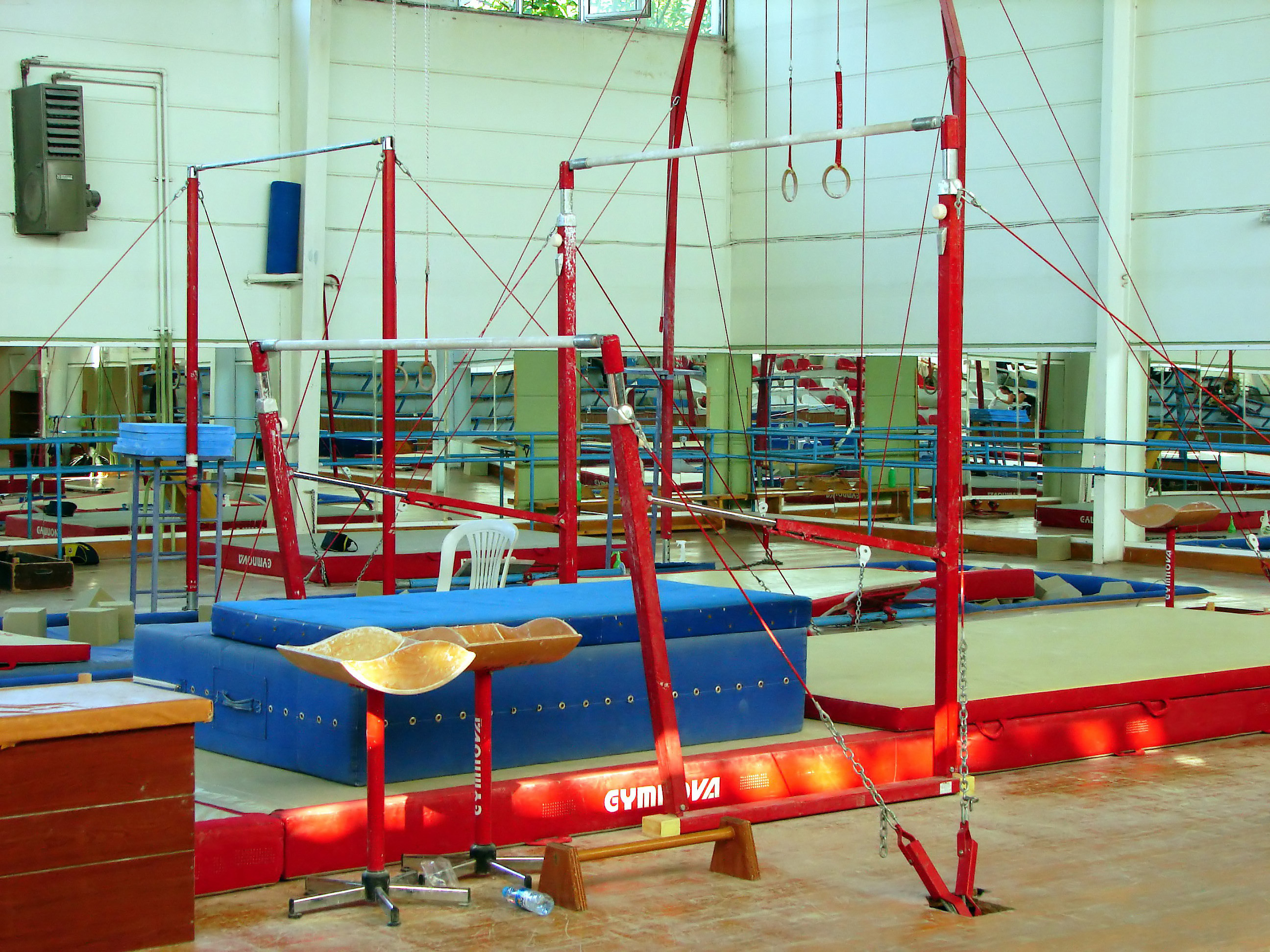
Various gymnastics apparatuses. Apparatuses shown include the horizontal (high) bar, the uneven bars, and still rings.

AA
Abbreviation for all-around.
AB
A scoring abbreviation for uneven bars, from the name asymmetric bars.
A-score
Under the current Code of Points, this score tallies the gymnast' counted skills, combinations and EGR. In theory, the A-score can be open-ended, depending on the skills the gymnast presents.
Acrobatic gymnastics
A discipline of gymnastics where partners work together to combine the tumbling and power of the floor exercise in artistic gymnastics with the flexibility and artistry of dance. Acrobatic gymnastics routines are performed on the floor apparatus.
All-around
A term in which a singular athlete competes (and scored in) on all four (women) or six (men) apparatus in a single continuous meet. This can be qualified individually as part of, or simultaneously during, a team competition, and/or in a completely separate singular continuous event termed 'Individual All-Around Finals'.
Amplitude

The range through which a body moves in the execution of a gymnastic skill, including height, distance, and motion of joints. The term encompasses external amplitude (movement of the body relative to the ground or apparatus) and internal amplitude (range though which body parts move in relation to each other). Maximizing amplitude by performing with the greatest possible degree of height, extension, strength, and flexibility creates a "larger than life," aesthetically pleasing and functionally sound movement. Insufficient amplitude in elements is a technical error that receives a points deduction in the FIG men's Code of Points and can be an execution or artistry deduction in the women's Code of Points.

Arabian
Type of salto that starts out with a backward entry into a half twist that begins immediately after takeoff, and then continues into a front flip.
Apparatus
Specific equipment used in gymnastics.
Artistic gymnastics
A discipline of gymnastics in which competitors perform upon apparatuses.
Arabesque
Standing on one leg with the other leg raised about 45 degrees.
Aerial
A type of cartwheel where a gymnast's hands do not touch the ground.
Aerial twist
An acrobatic flip that incorporates a 180° rotation during the peak of the flip's height.

== B ==
Back handspring
A skill in which the gymnast jump reaches for the floor and kicks over with their legs together at all times.

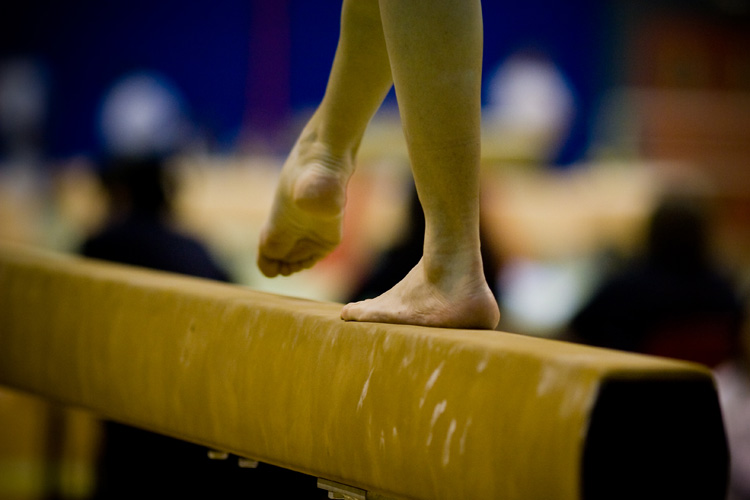
The balance beam

B-score
Under the current Code of Points, this score rates the gymnast's execution, form, artistry and technique. The judges take their deductions from the 10.0 base score.
Back-to-back tumbling
A series of skills in which the gymnast executes a tumbling pass from one corner of the mat to the other, rebounds, and performs another tumbling pass in the other direction without stopping. Notably performed by Oksana Omelianchik (URS), Daniela Silivaș (ROU) and Dominique Dawes (USA).
Balance
One of the three routines in acrobatic gymnastics, highlighted by static hold positions that demonstrate strength, agility and flexibility.
Balance beam
A gymnastics apparatus used by women in artistic gymnastics. It is a 4-inch-wide (100 mm) platform upon which gymnasts perform tumbling and dance skills.
Ball
A gymnastics apparatus used in rhythmic gymnastics. The ball rests in the gymnast's hands, is balanced on the body, and is thrown into the air and caught.
Banned skills
Prohibited gymnastic moves due to high risk of injuries for the performing athlete.
Base
In acrobatic gymnastics, the role in pair and group competition that requires strength and balance. The base is usually an older, larger athlete.
BB
The scoring abbreviation for balance beam.
Bib
The number worn on the gymnast's back, and used in the scoring and roster sheets, to identify them to the judges.

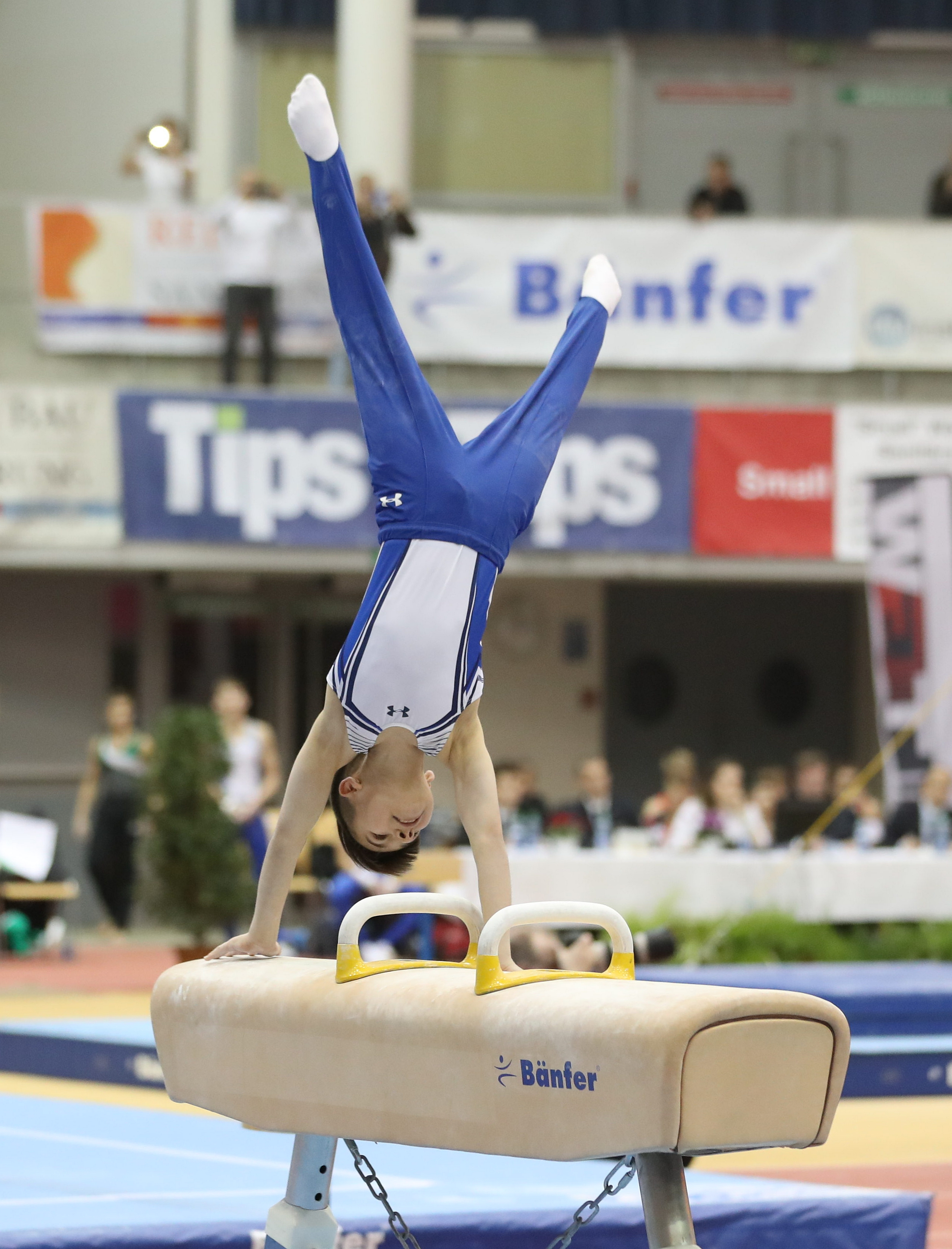
Gymnast performing a Busnari on pommel horse at the Austrian Future Cup 2018.

Busnari
Reverse Stöckli straddle through handstand. Named after Alberto Busnari.
B turn
Backtuck.

== C ==
Cassina
Kovacs straight with 1/1 turn; named after Igor Cassina.
Chestroll
This skill to bend the back. It is also called a chin stand.
Cartwheel
The maneuver where one moves sideways, from hands to feet, in a straight line (in the motion that the wheel of a cart would follow), while keeping the back, arms, and legs straight, and the feet pointed.

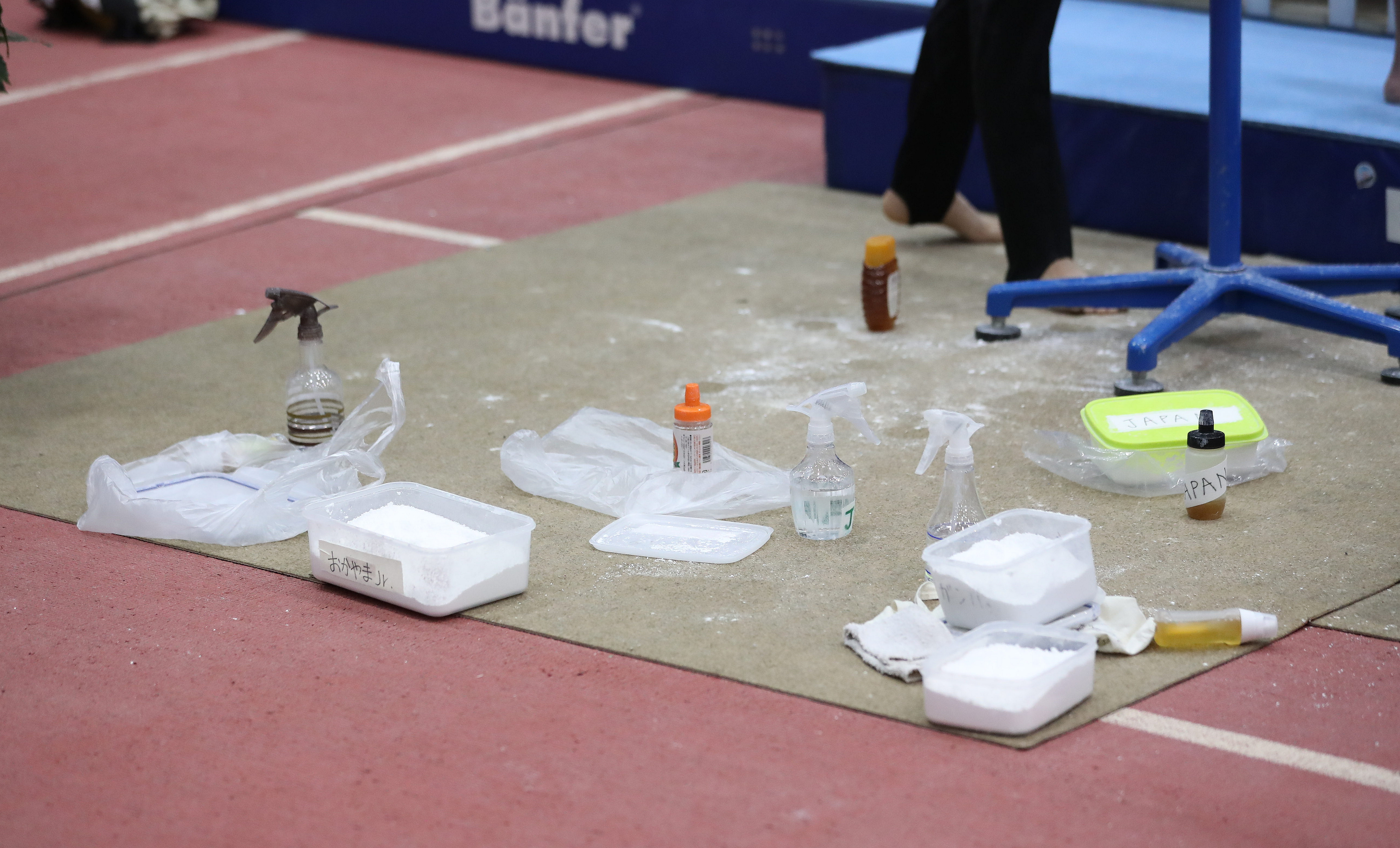
Different kinds of chalk used by the Japanese team at the Austrian Future Cup 2018.

Chalk
Carbonate of magnesia, used by gymnasts on their hands, feet and apparatus to make the surface of the equipment less slippery, or to mark lines on the mats.
Circle
A full circle with the legs together and both hands supporting the gymnast. One of the three basic swings on the Pommel Horse.
Clubs
A gymnastics apparatus used in rhythmic gymnastics.
Code of Points
The document that regulates scoring of each discipline.
Combined
Presented only during acrobatic gymnastics finals, the Combined routine features the elements of both the Balance and the Dynamic (Tempo) routines.
Competition
Performance in front of a judge which the judge will then score and give points.

== D ==
Derwael-Fenton
Release move on uneven bars: backward Stalder with counter straddle reverse hecht over the high bar with half (180 degree) turn to hang in mixed L-grip. Introduced by Belgian gymnast Nina Derwael and British gymnast Georgia-Mae Fenton.
Diamidov
Swing forward with 1/1 (360°) turn on one arm to handstand on parallel bars. Named after Sergey Diomidov.
Difficulty value

The difficulty of an element according to the Code of Points Table of Elements. Elements on all apparatuses except vault are rated on a difficulty scale from A (0.1 value) to J (1.0 value). The difficulty values of successfully performed elements are added to compositional requirements and connection points to calculate a gymnastic routine's D score.

Dismount
The act of getting off an apparatus and the skill used to do it.
Dynamic
One of the three routines in acrobatic gymnastics, combining choreography with tumbling sequences and flight elements like throws.
Dive Roll
Transitioning from handstand into forward roll.

Execution of the Diamidov

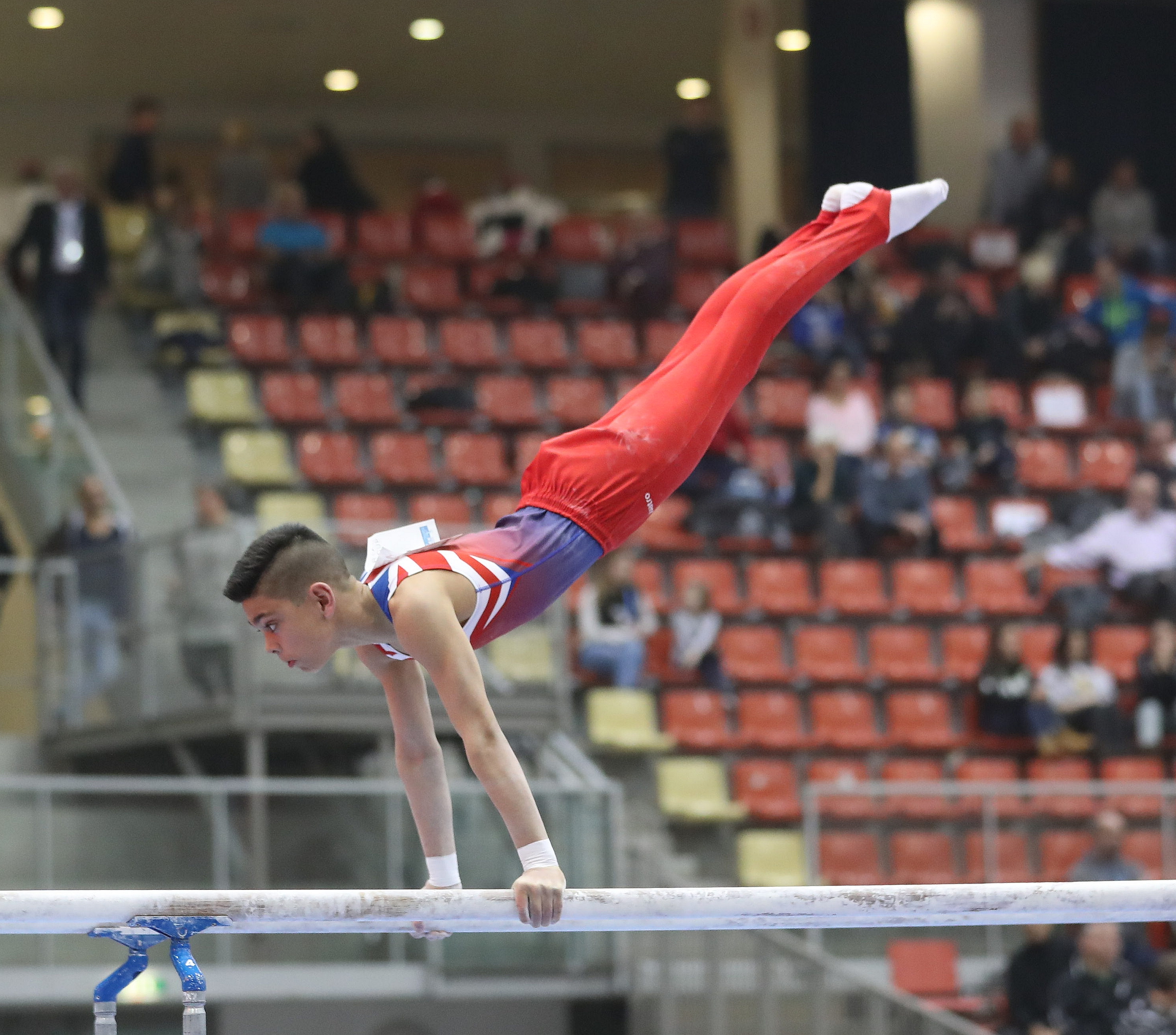
Performed by a young gymnast at the Austrian Future Cup 2018

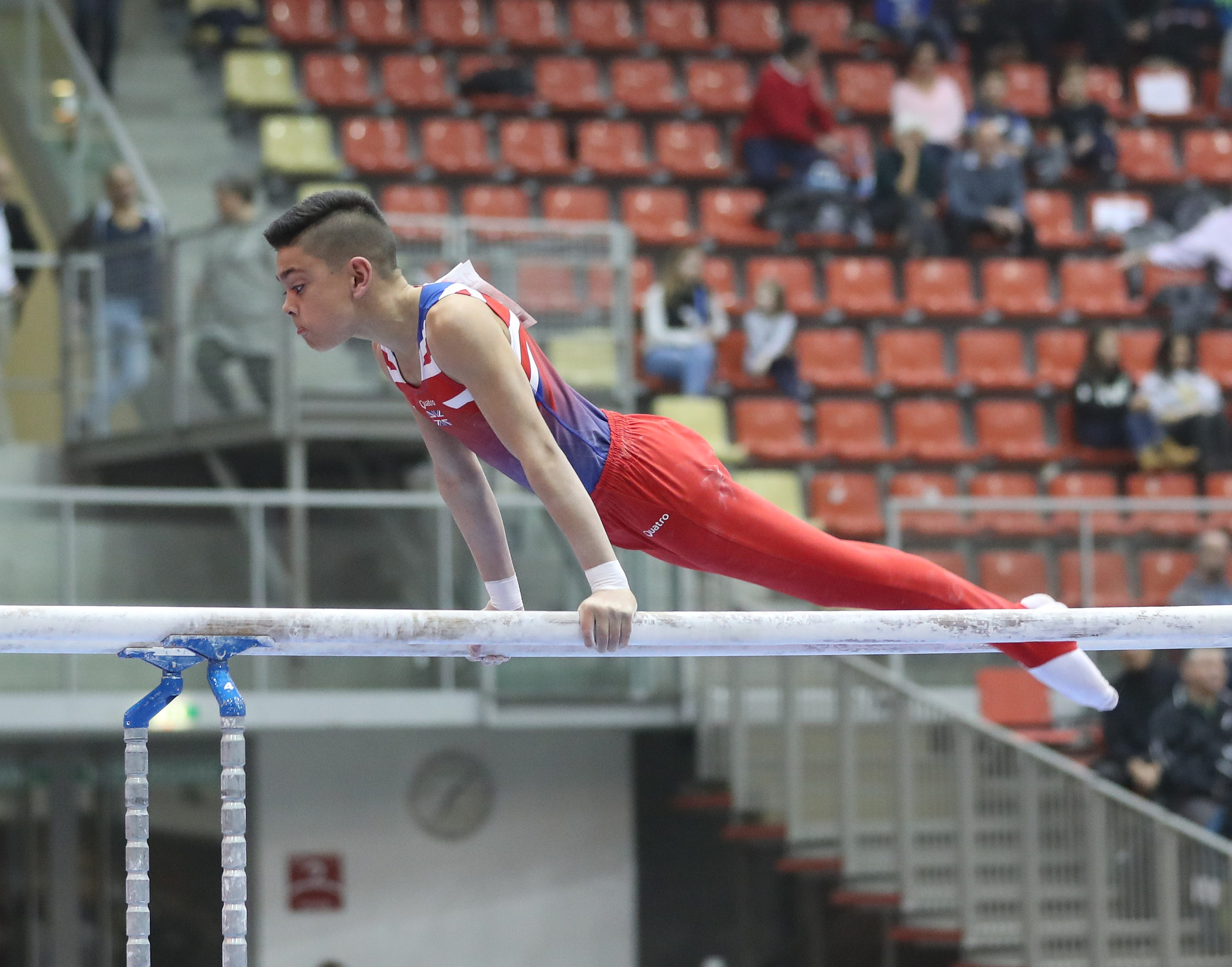

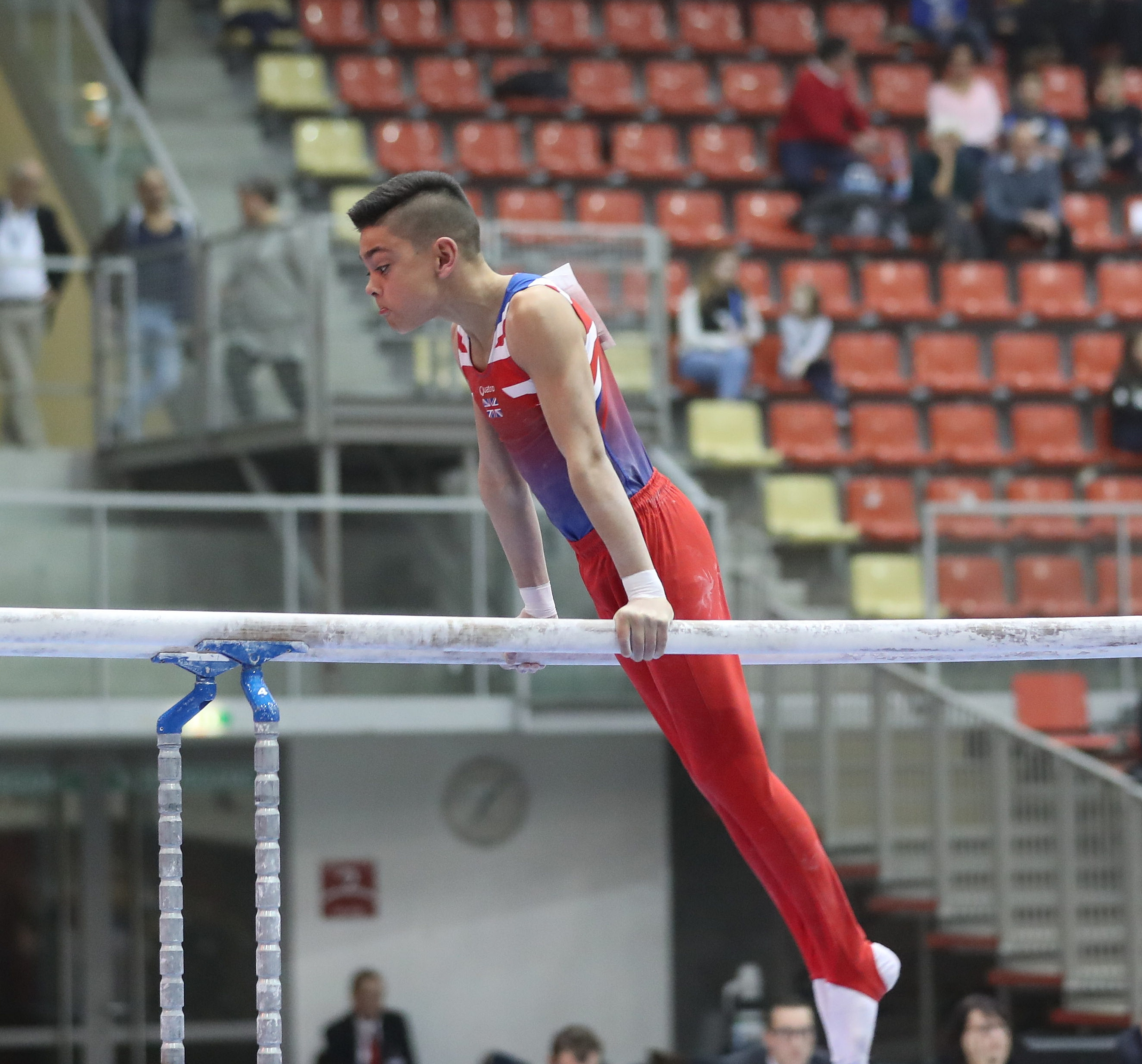

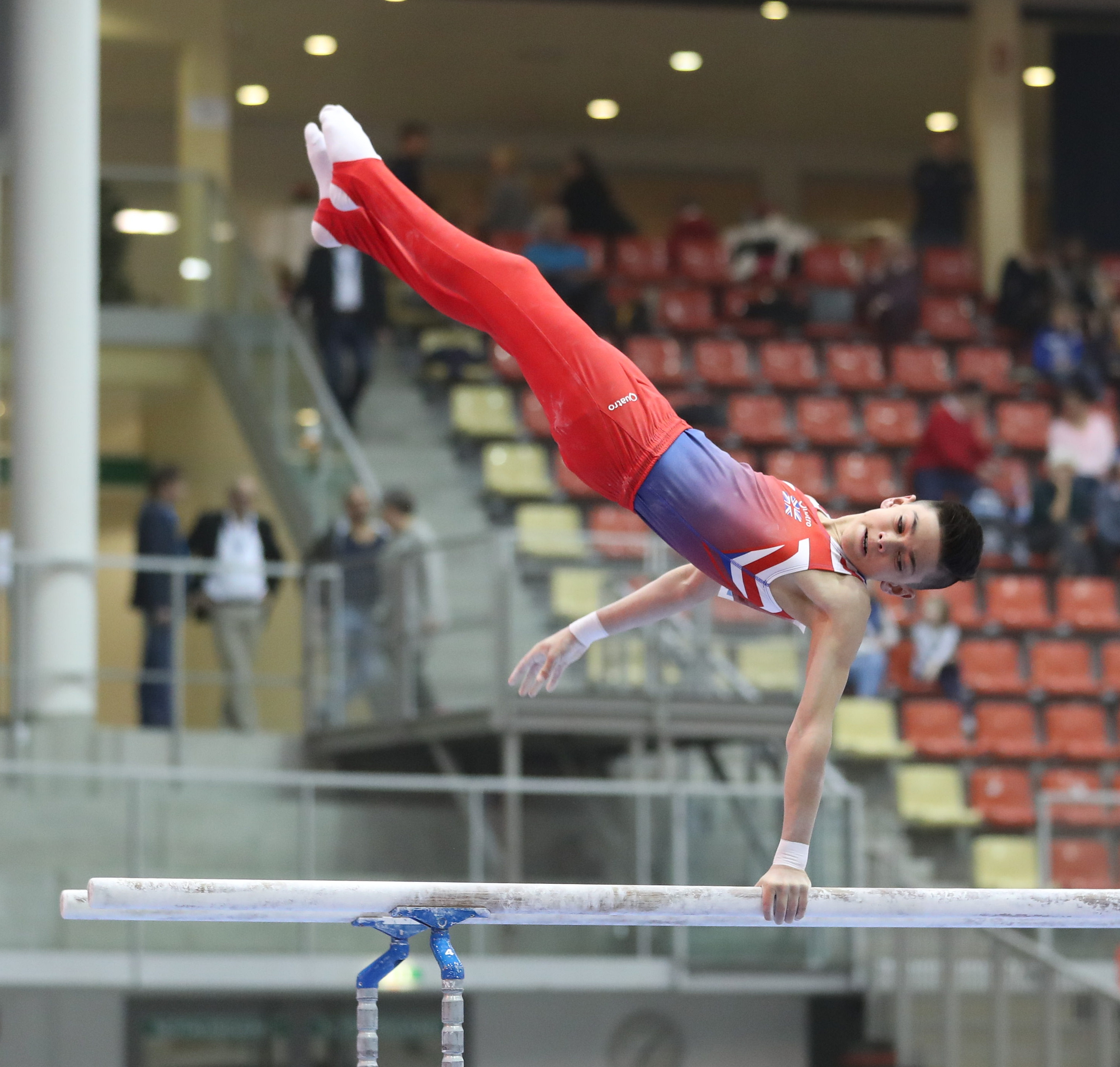

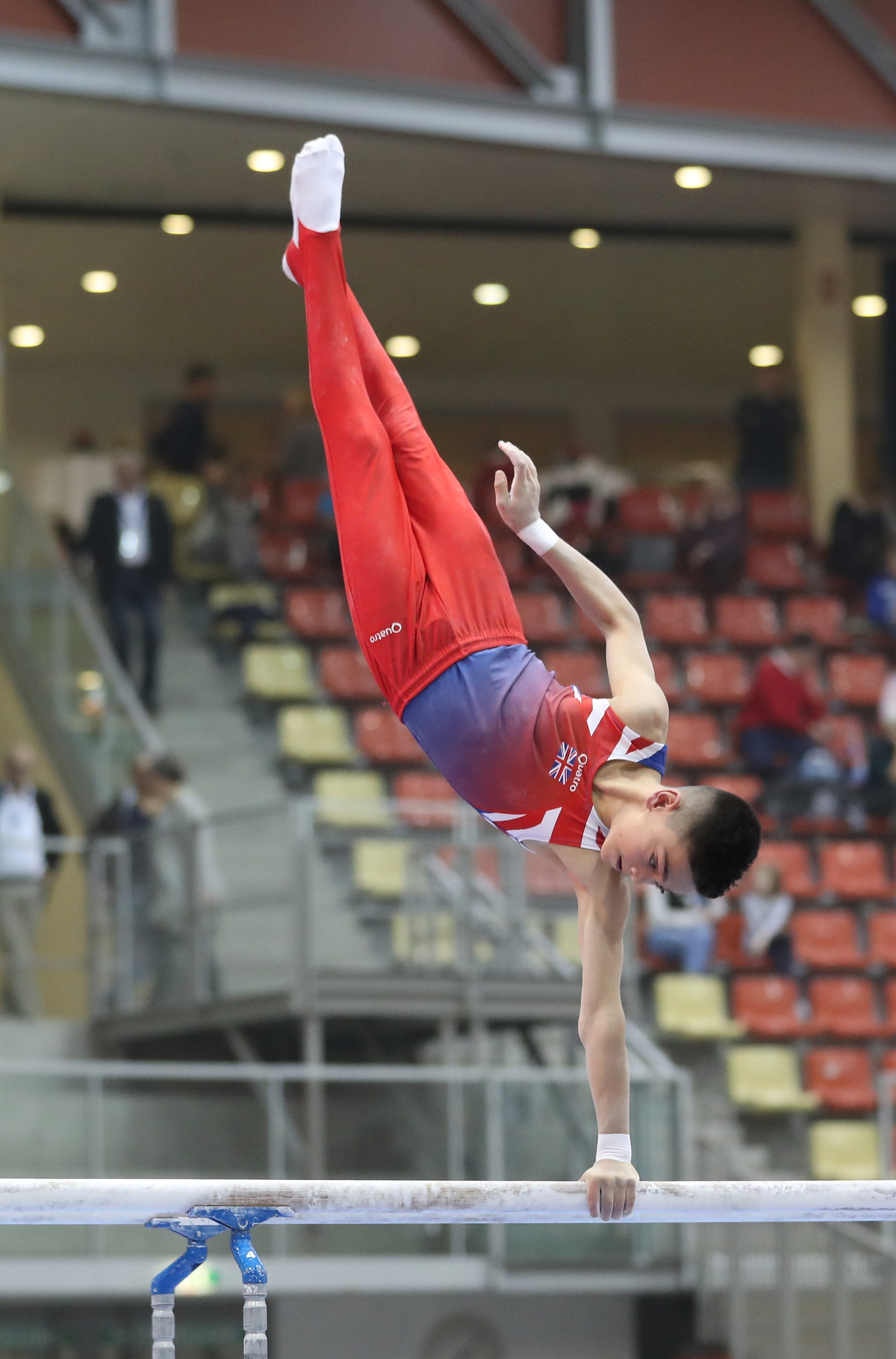

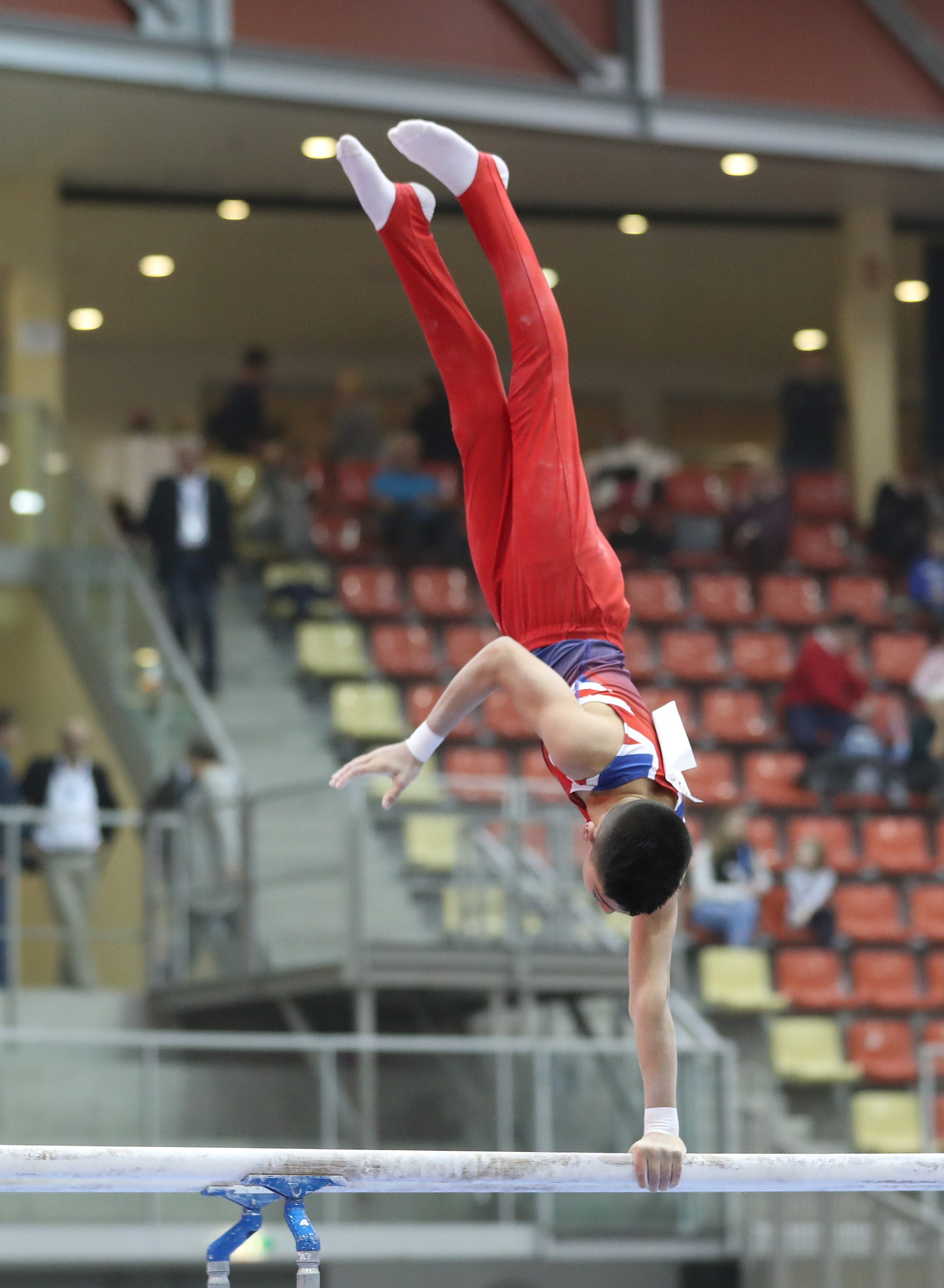

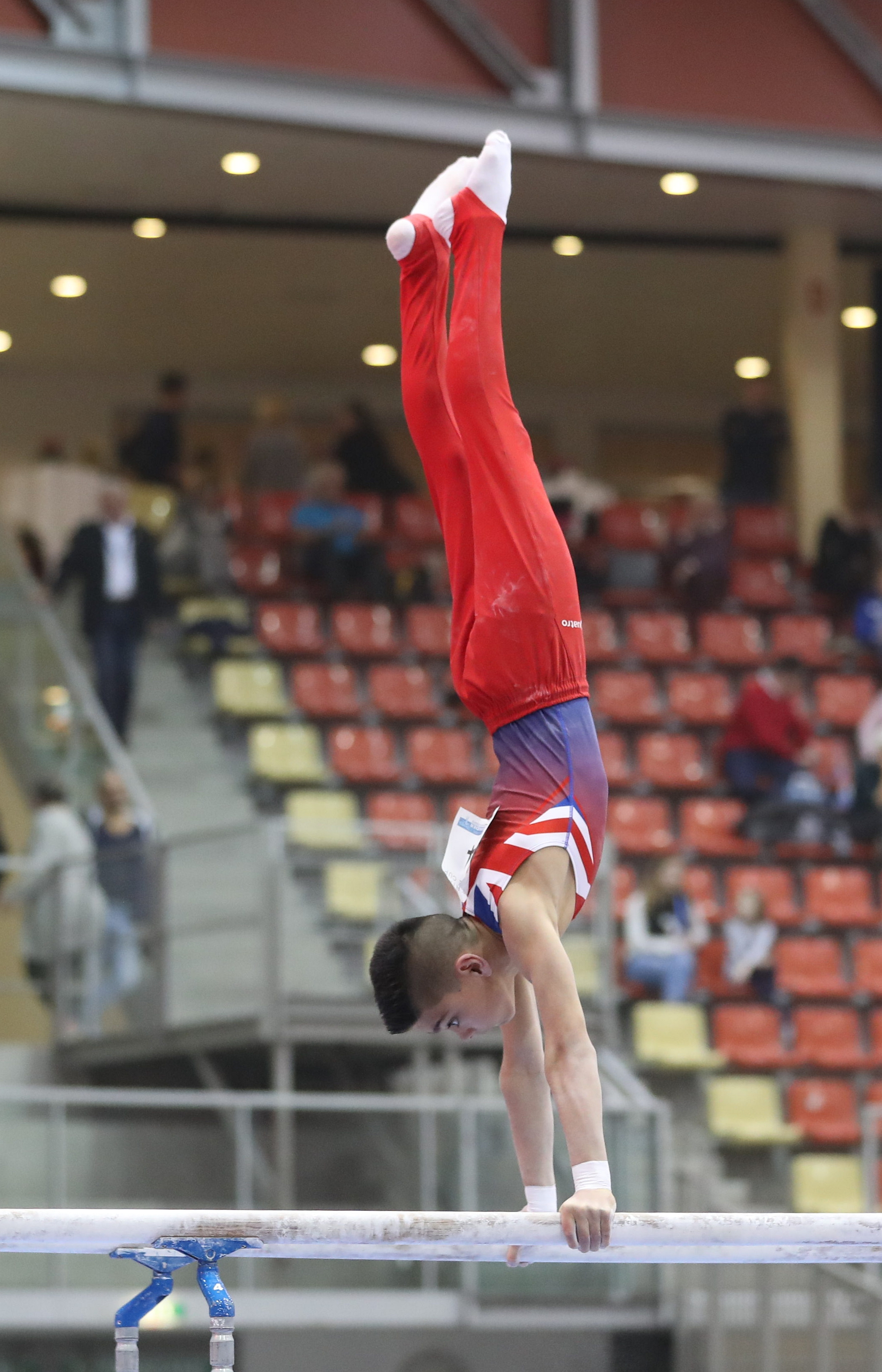

== E ==
EGR
Abbreviation for element group requirements.
Element group requirements
Under the current Code of Points, the specific required skills, or skill families, a gymnast must show at some point in their routine on each event. For instance, on uneven bars, one of the EGRs is a release move. Currently, five EGR skills are required on every event.
Elite
The highest competitive level in gymnastics, or a gymnast who competes at the highest level. The term is used in the US, Australia, and some other nations, but is not universal.
Elementary gymnastics
The type of gymnastics that older gymnasts in training use. It helps them to understand the elements and way of gymnastics.
Elbow stand
An inverted pose in which the body is supported on only forearms.

== F ==
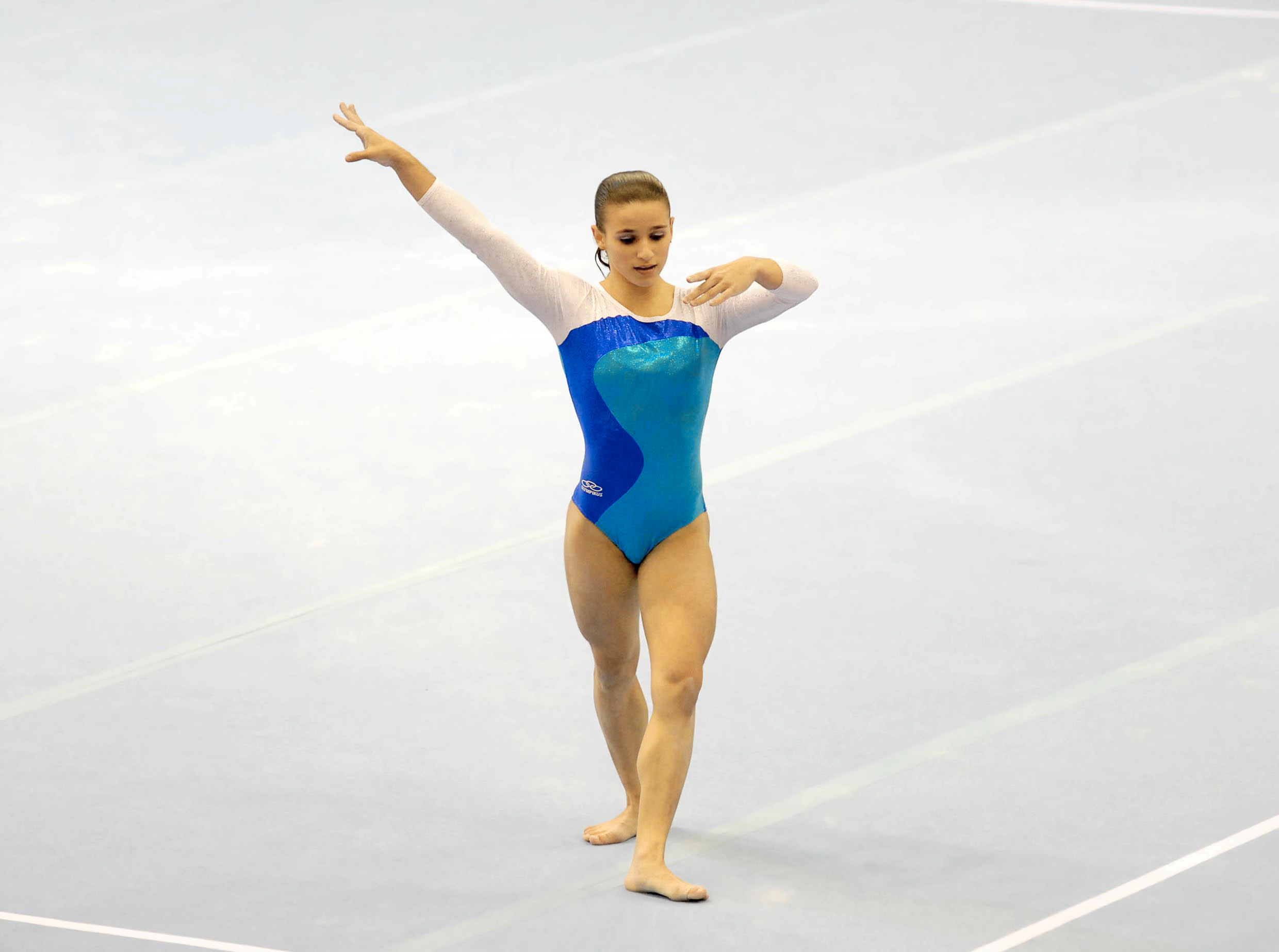
Jade Barbosa performing her floor routine during a gymnastics competition. The white lines indicate the bounds of the floor.

Fédération Internationale de Gymnastique
The international sports governing body for gymnastics. Its name is commonly abbreviated as "FIG".
Fitkid
consists of gymnastics, (acrobatics) aerobics, (aerobic jumps, power elements) rhythmic gymnastics (gymnastic jumps, relaxation elements) and dance, but different from each of them. This gives the sport a completely unique character.
Flight series
On balance beam, a series of acrobatic skills performed in combination from one end of the beam to the other.
Flip
A move where the gymnast will jump from a handstand;forwards or backward landing facing the same direction.
Floor
A gymnastics apparatus used in artistic gymnastics. The event performed upon this apparatus is known as Floor Exercise.
Floor exercise
The event performed on the floor apparatus. Gymnasts perform choreographed routines that include tumbling and acrobatic skills.
Freestyle gymnastics
A fusion of traditional gymnastic and acrobatic tricks, with kicks and leaps inspired by martial arts, parkour and free running. It captures the power and explosive nature of freestyle activities in sport and brings them indoors, performed on a range of purpose-built equipment with associated training techniques.
Front handspring
A gymnastics move in which the gymnast takes a running start, then places their hands as if a handstand. They kick one leg over, push off the ground, and come back up.
Front tuck
The act of running, jumping off of two feet, turning in mid air, and landing on the ground on two feet.
FX
The scoring abbreviation for floor exercise.
Full
A flip that turns fully in mid air.

== G ==
Gainer
A gymnastics skill in which a gymnast performs a backwards flip while moving forward.
Grip
See hand guard.
Gymnastics
A sport involving performance of exercises requiring physical strength, agility and coordination. It evolved from exercises used by the ancient Greeks, including skills for mounting and dismounting a horse, and circus performance skills.
Giant
When casting into a handstand position and making a full rotation around the bar while the body is kept in a straight line.
Good leg split
A split with the gymnast's stronger leg forward.

== H ==
Hand guard
A glove or wrist strap worn by gymnasts to protect the skin on their hands when they perform upon apparatuses.
Hanging position
Initial position of the gymnasts before the exercise. Only on still rings and horizontal bar, the gymnast is guaranteed the right to be assisted to the hanging position by a coach or gymnast.
HB
The scoring abbreviation for horizontal (or high) bar.
High bar
See horizontal bar.
Hit
To perform a routine or skill to the best of one's ability, with no major errors or deductions. Example: "He hit the dismount." May also be used as an adjective to describe a routine performed well.
Hoop
A gymnastics apparatus used in rhythmic gymnastics. It is a hollow hoop with an interior diameter of 80 to 90 cm.
Horizontal bar
A gymnastics apparatus used by men in artistic gymnasts. It consists of one 2.4m bar upon which gymnasts perform skills. It is also known as high bar.
Handstand
To stand inverted straight up with squeezed vertical body tension, with hands as a base support on floor.

Gymnast being assisted to hanging position

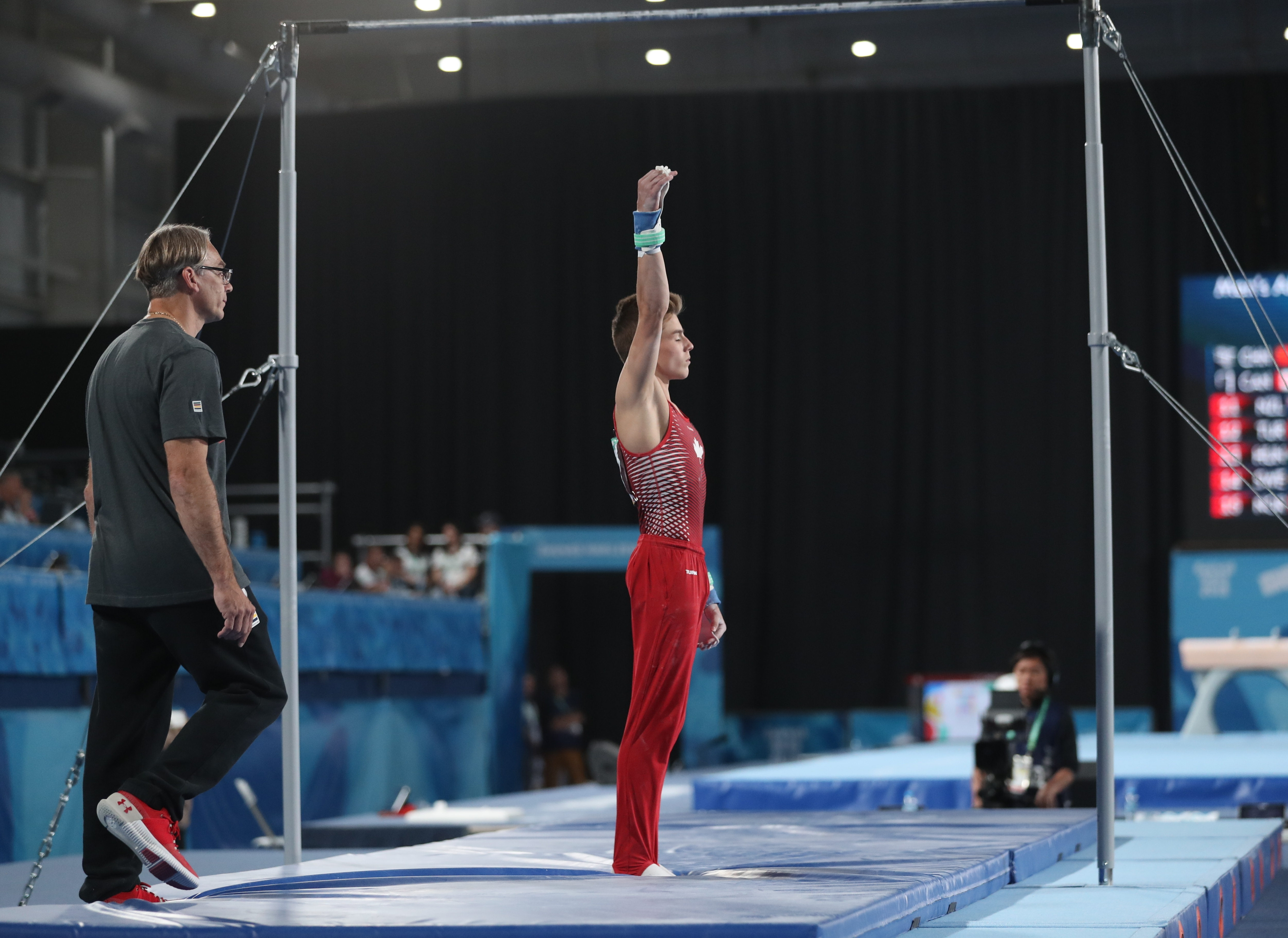
Gymnast sends a signal to the jury that he is ready for the exercise

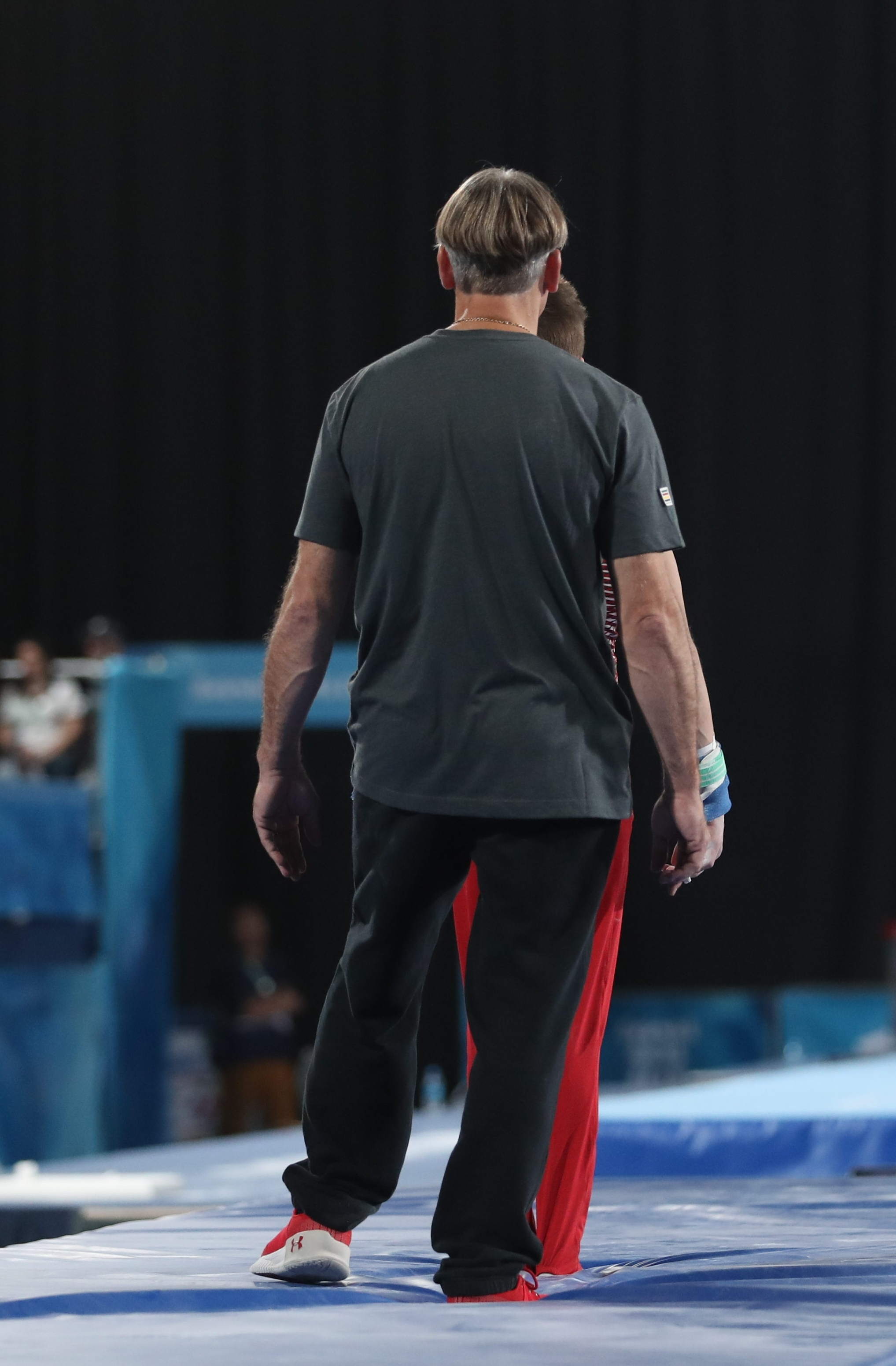
Coach takes position behind the gymnast

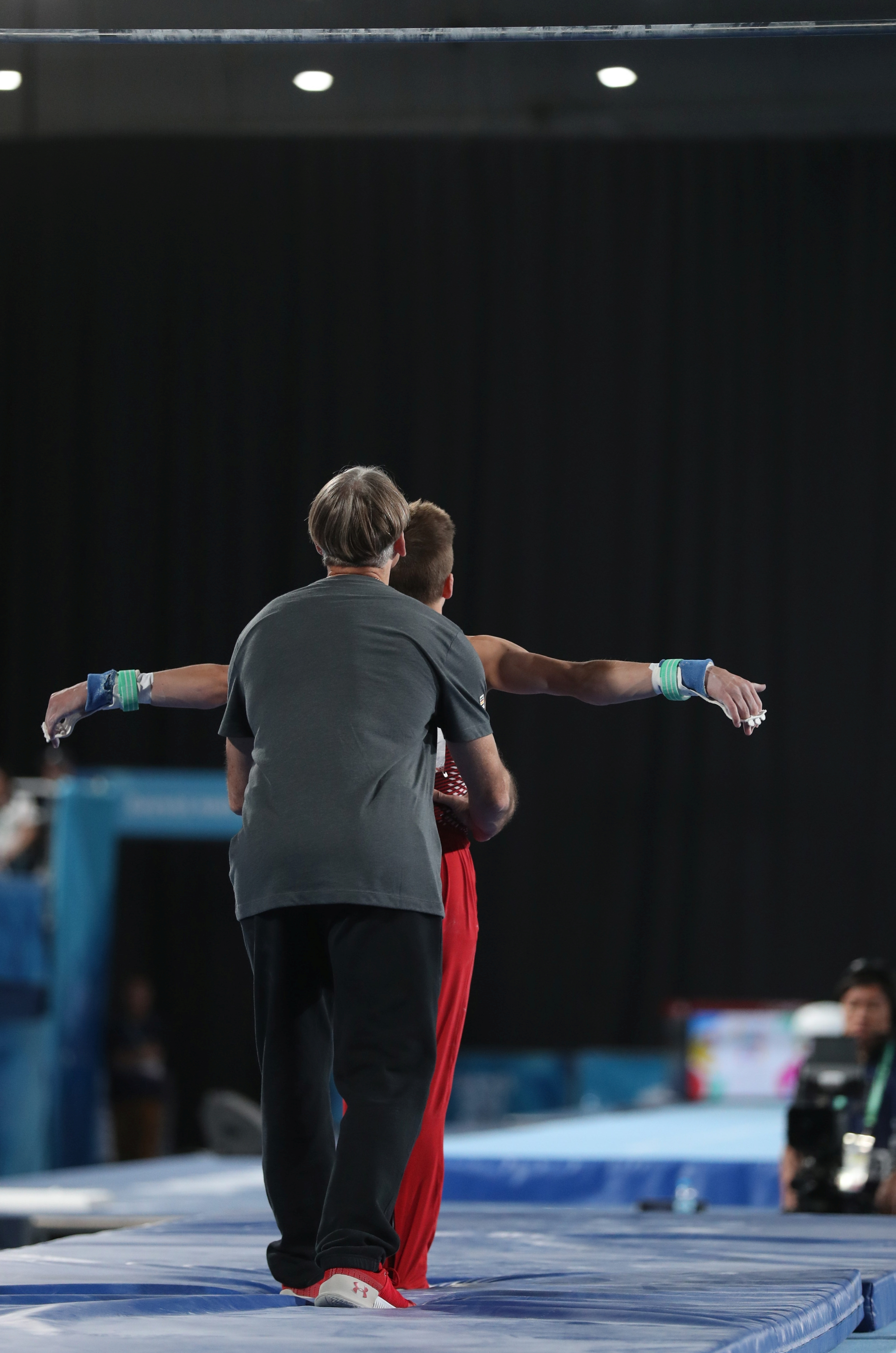
Gymnast and coach prepare to reach out to the hanging position

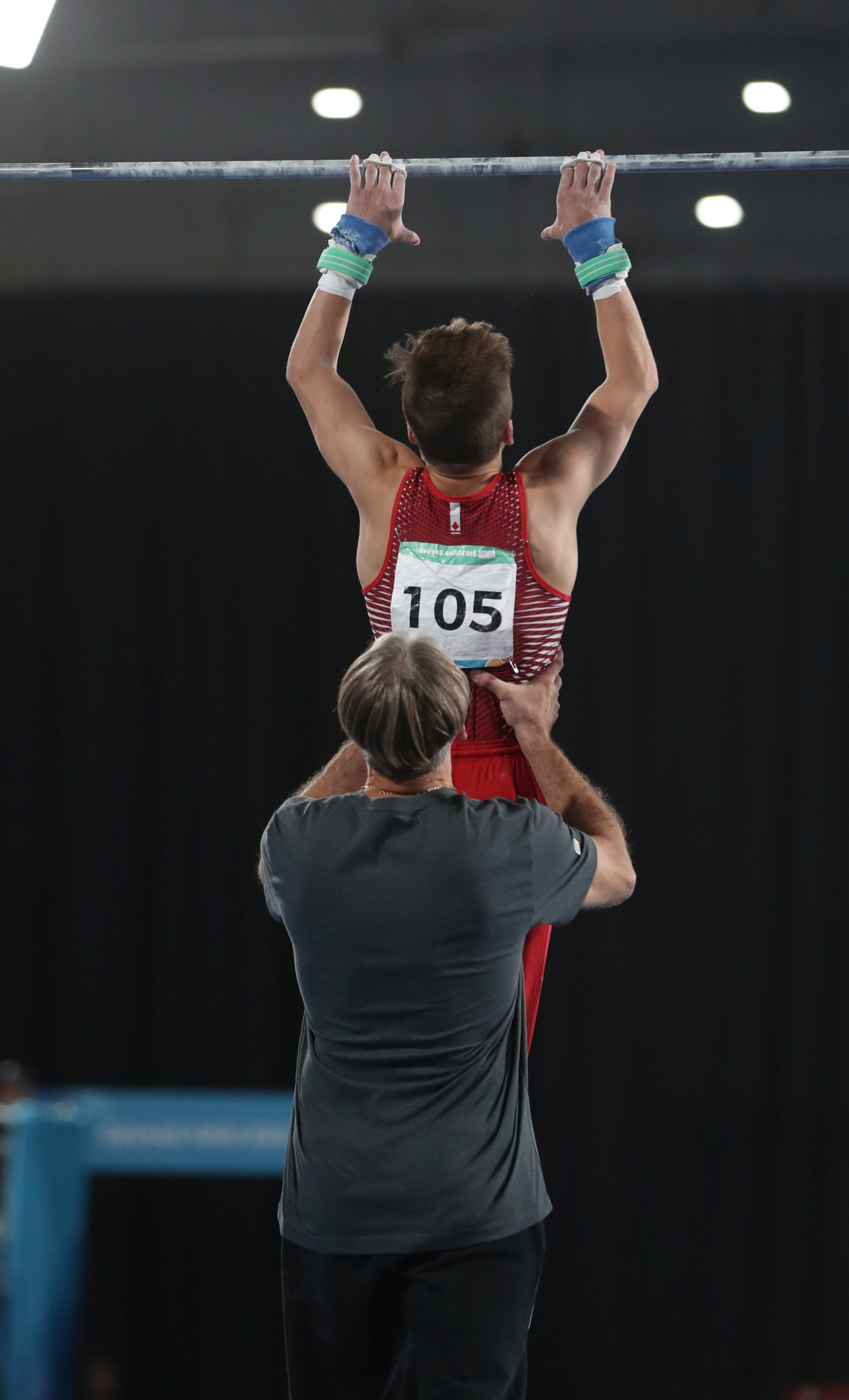
After the gymnast jumped up, the coach assists the gymnast by lifting him up

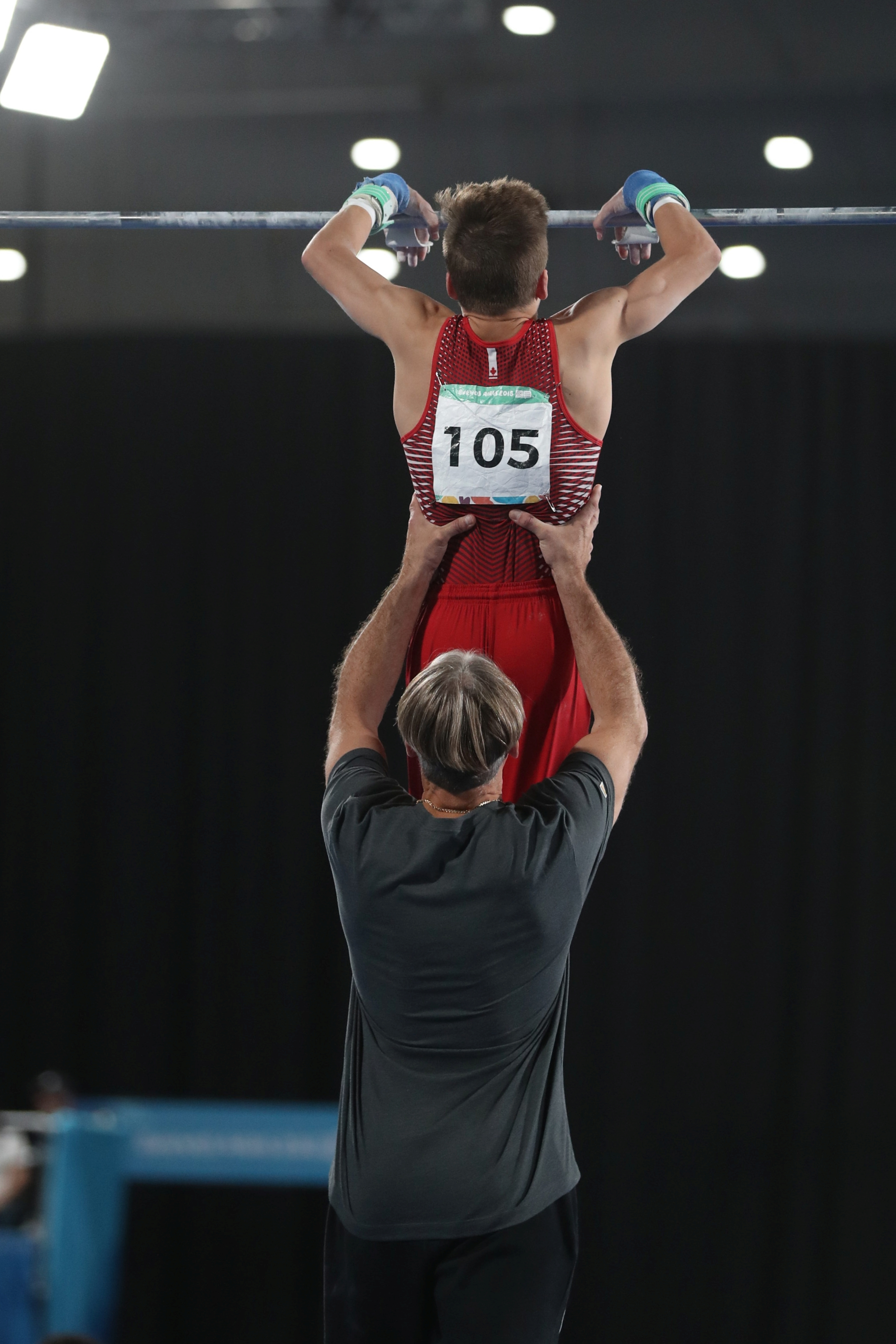
Gymnast graps the apparatus (here: horizontal bar), afterwards the coach steps back

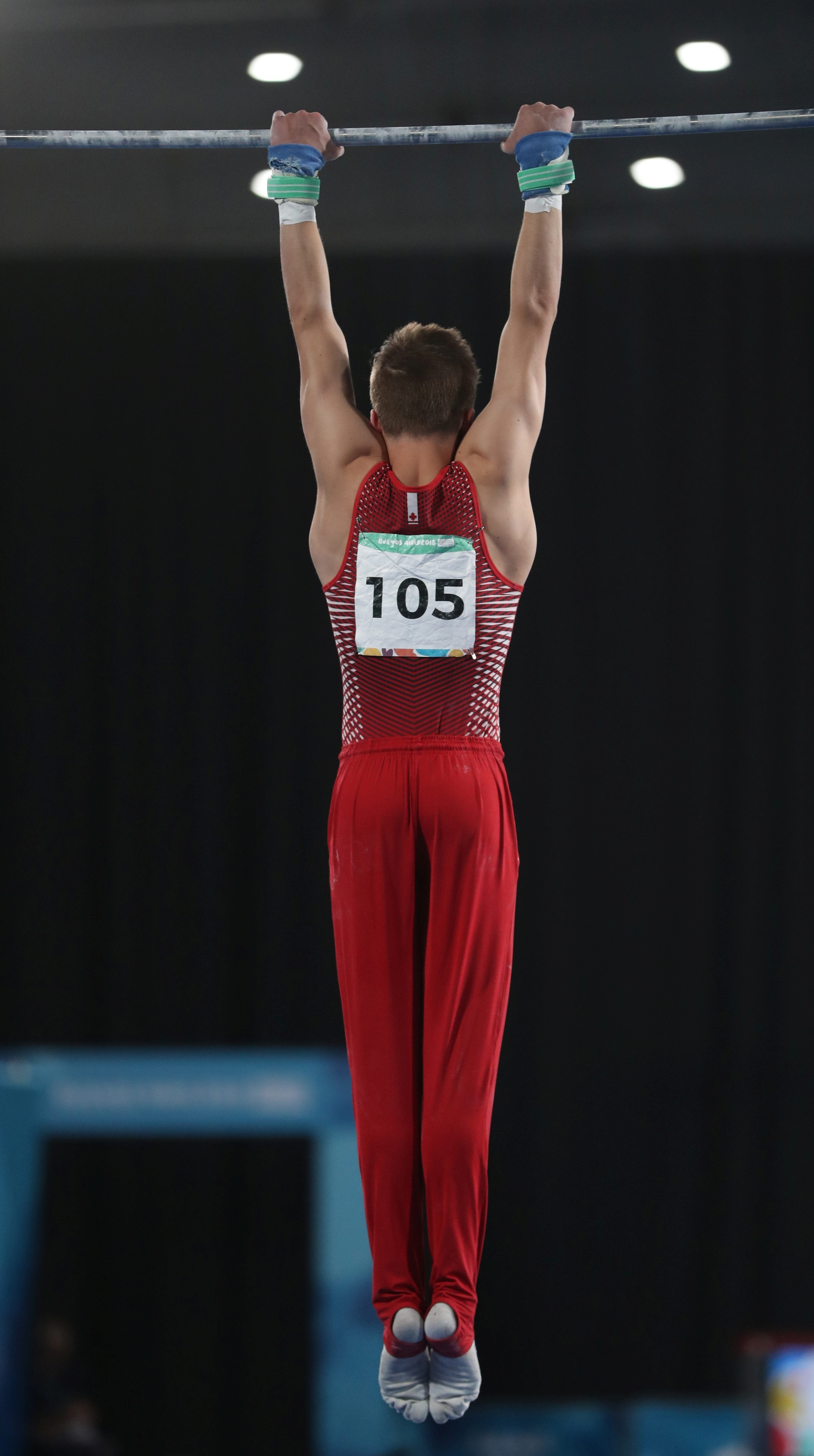
The gymnast has reached the hanging position and is ready to start the exercise

== I ==
Indian clubs
A type of exercise equipment used to present resistance in movement to develop strength and mobility, originated in the Indian subcontinent.
Illusion
A challenging move that is performed by spinning on one foot with the chest at the ground.

== J ==
Junior
A world-class/elite gymnast who is too young to compete as a senior, usually between the ages of 13 and 15.
Judges
Trained professionals who judge gymnasts on their skills on each apparatus.
Jumps
A straight, tucked, piked, straddle or split jump.

== K ==
Kip
A basic skill in artistic gymnastics on the uneven bars that is used at a way of getting on the bar in a front support position or a handstand from a hanging or standing position.
Kip
A training skill in trampolining.
Kolman
A full-twisting Kovacs with two back somersaults and one full twist over the bar, after Alojz Kolman (Slovenia).
Kolyvanov
From side support on end – flair or circle to handstand and travel 3/3 with 5/4 (450°) or more turn. Named after Alexander Kolyvanov.
Kovacs
Double salto backward over the bar. Named after Péter Kovács (see article for execution).

Execution of the Kolman

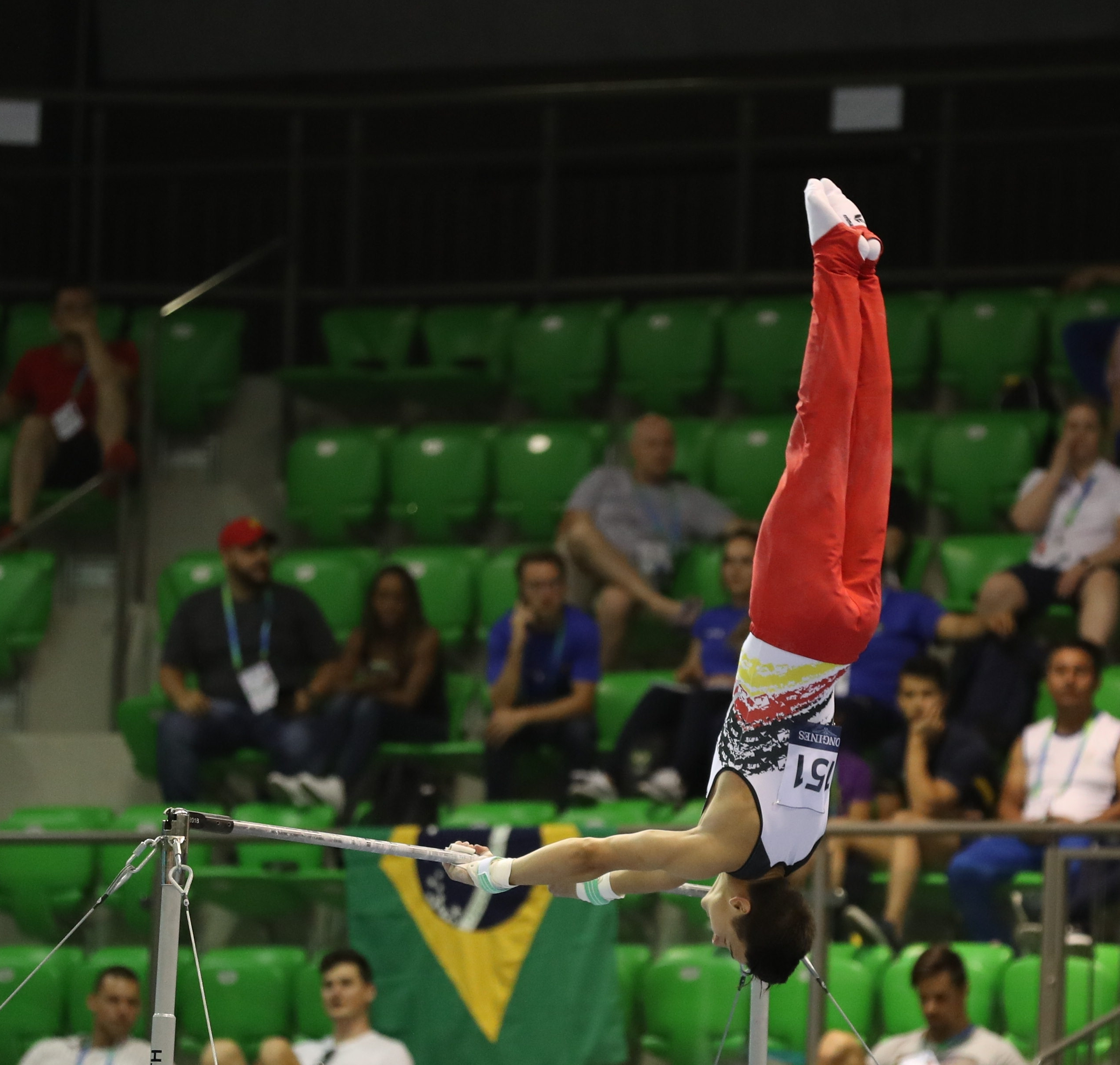
Performed by a young gymnast during at the 2019 Junior World Artistic Gymnastics Championships

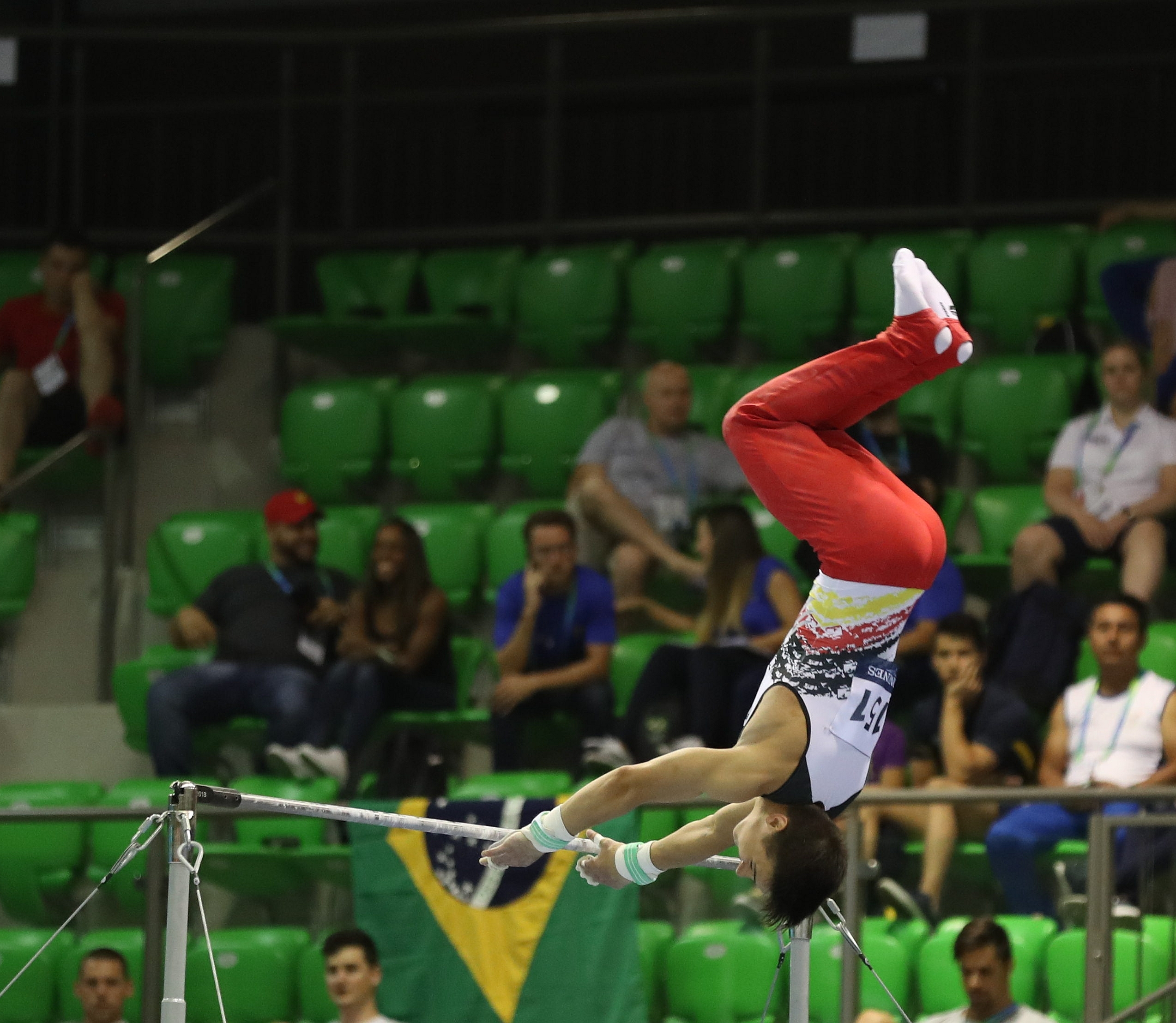

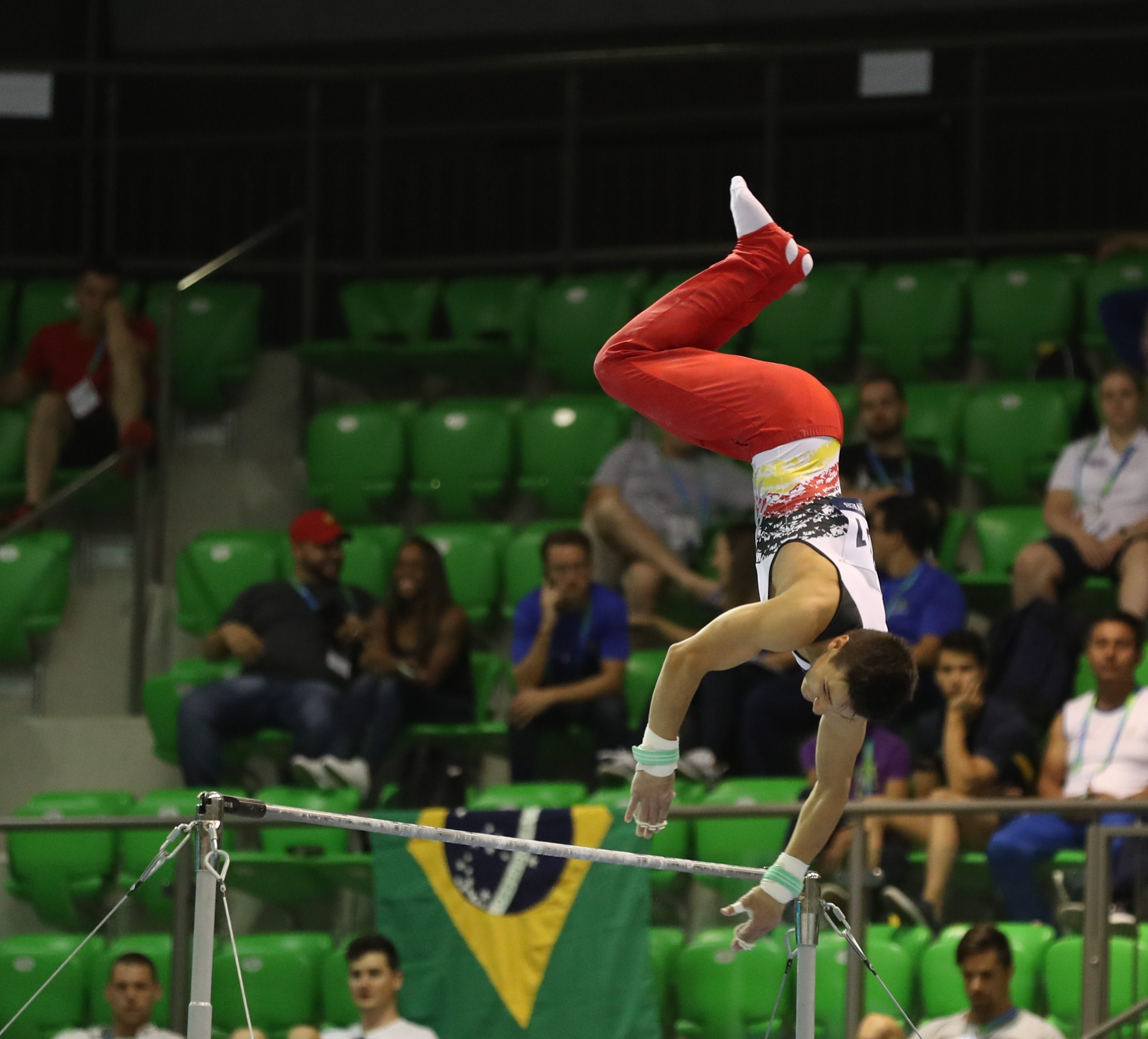

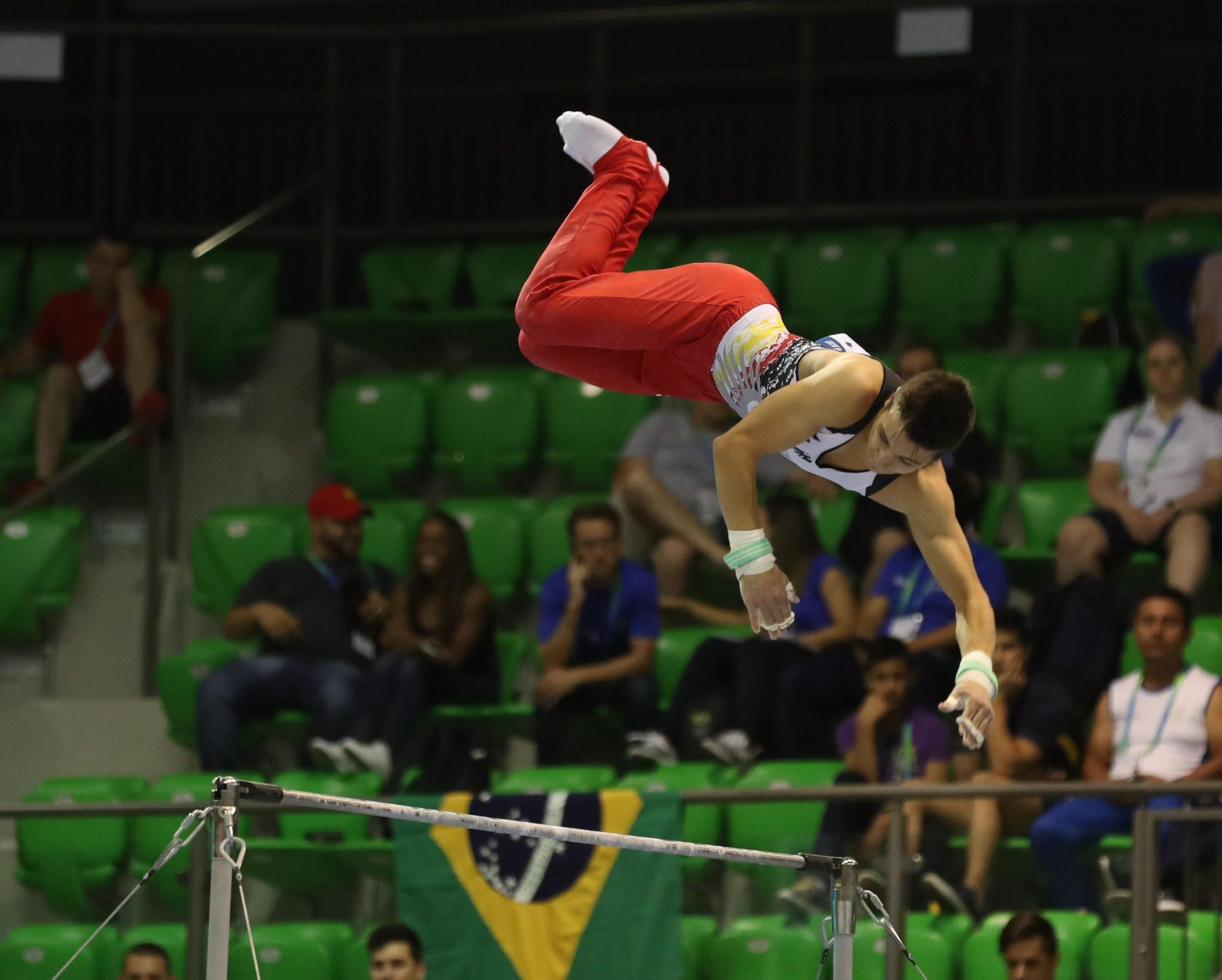

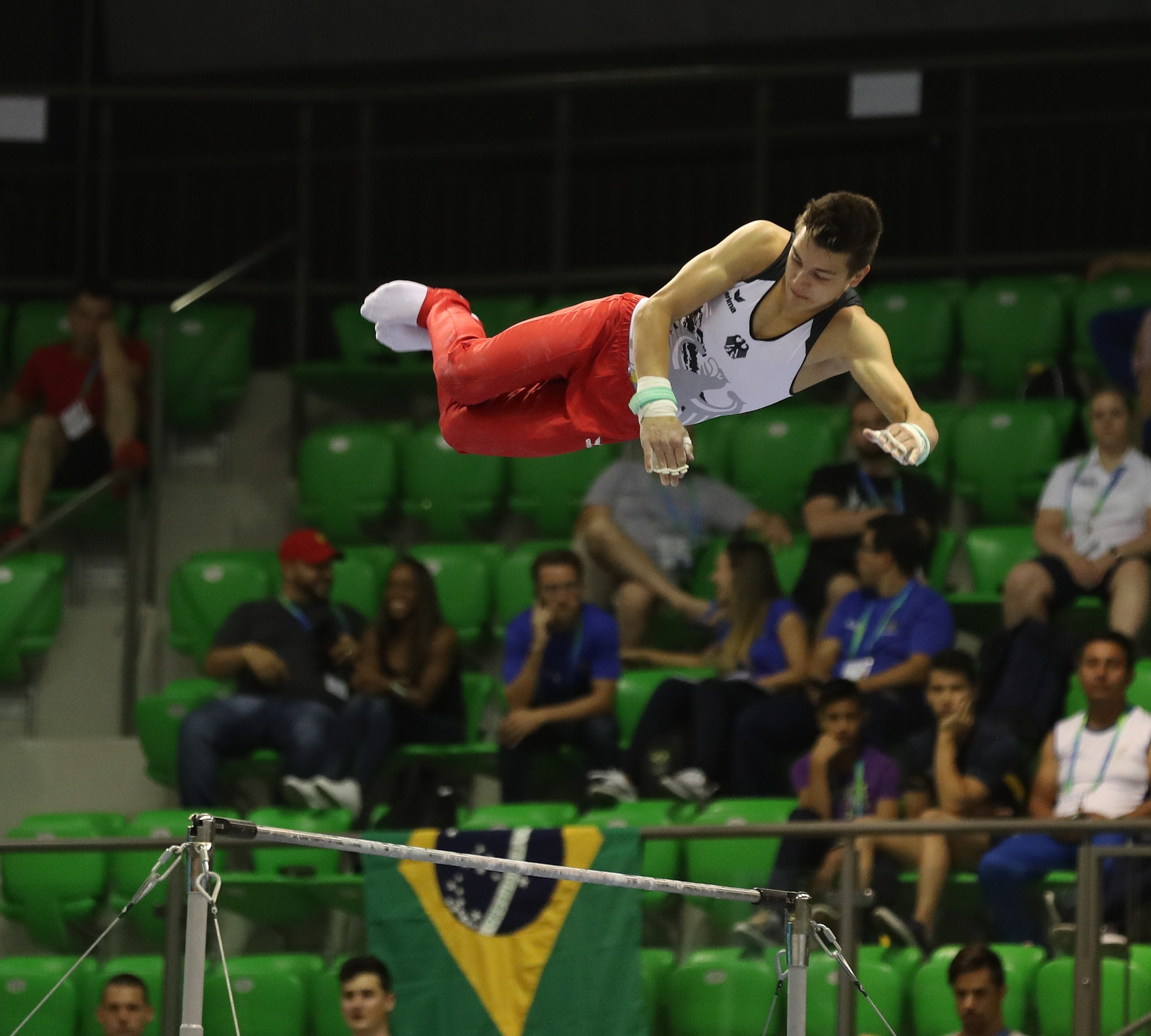

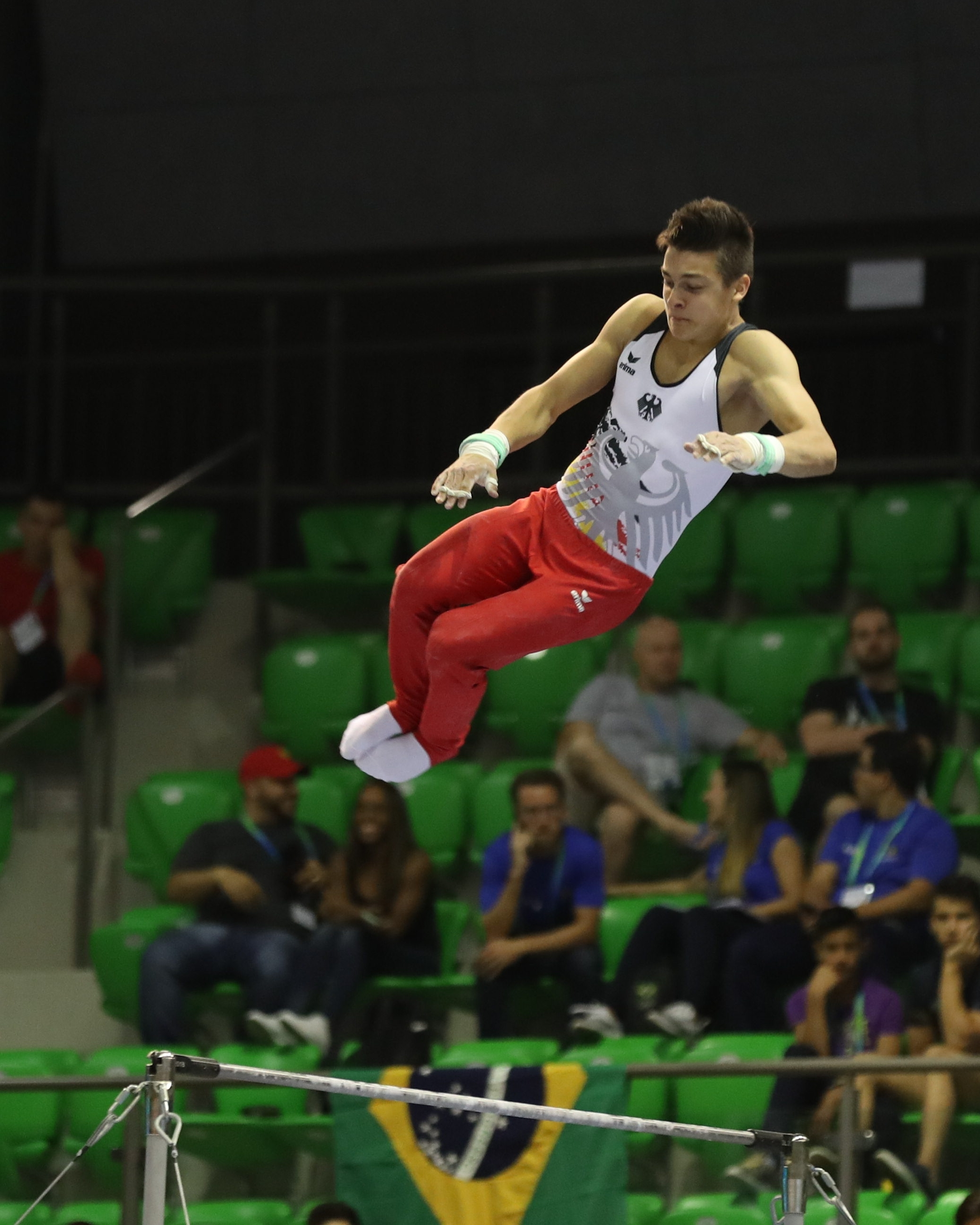

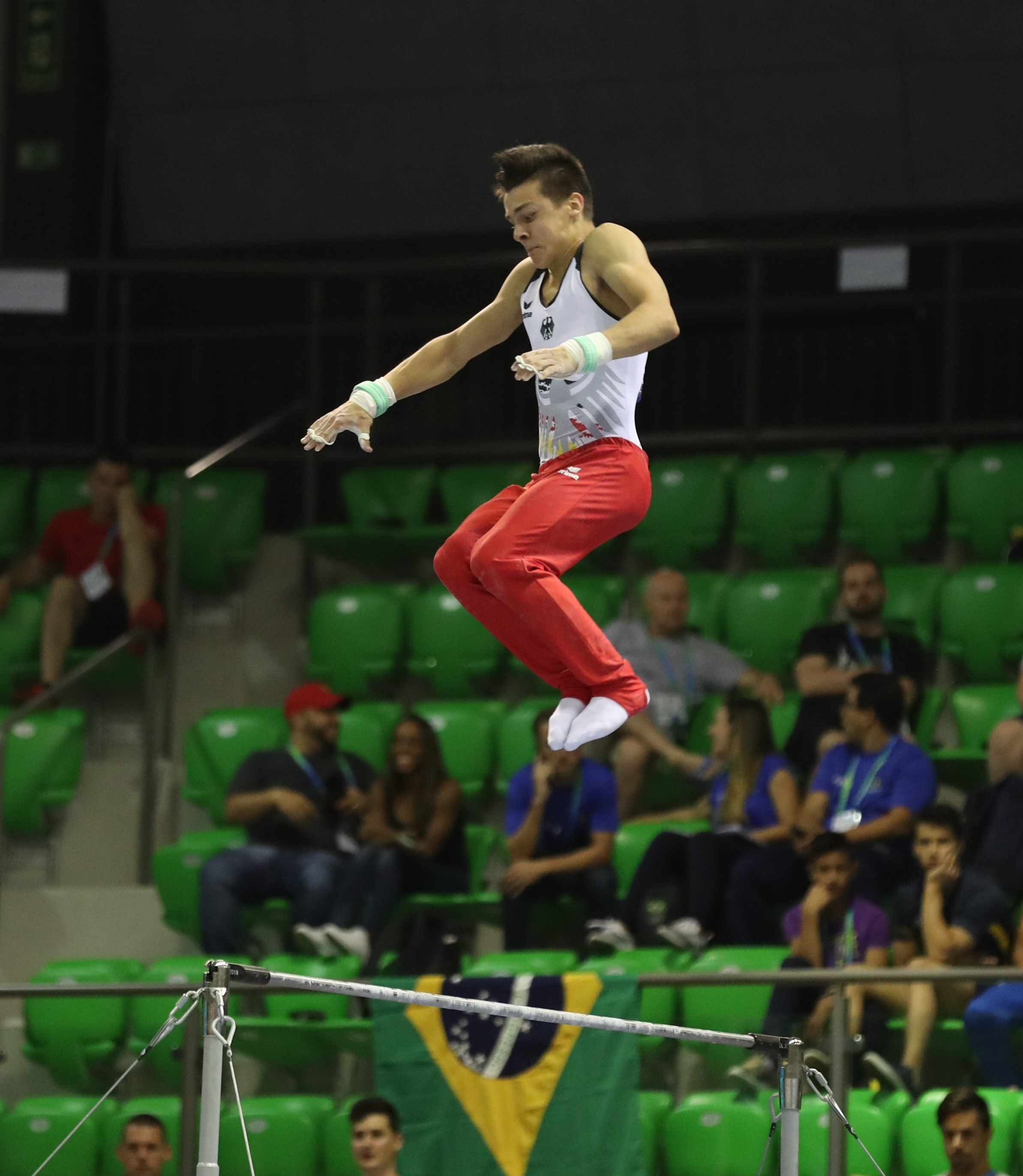

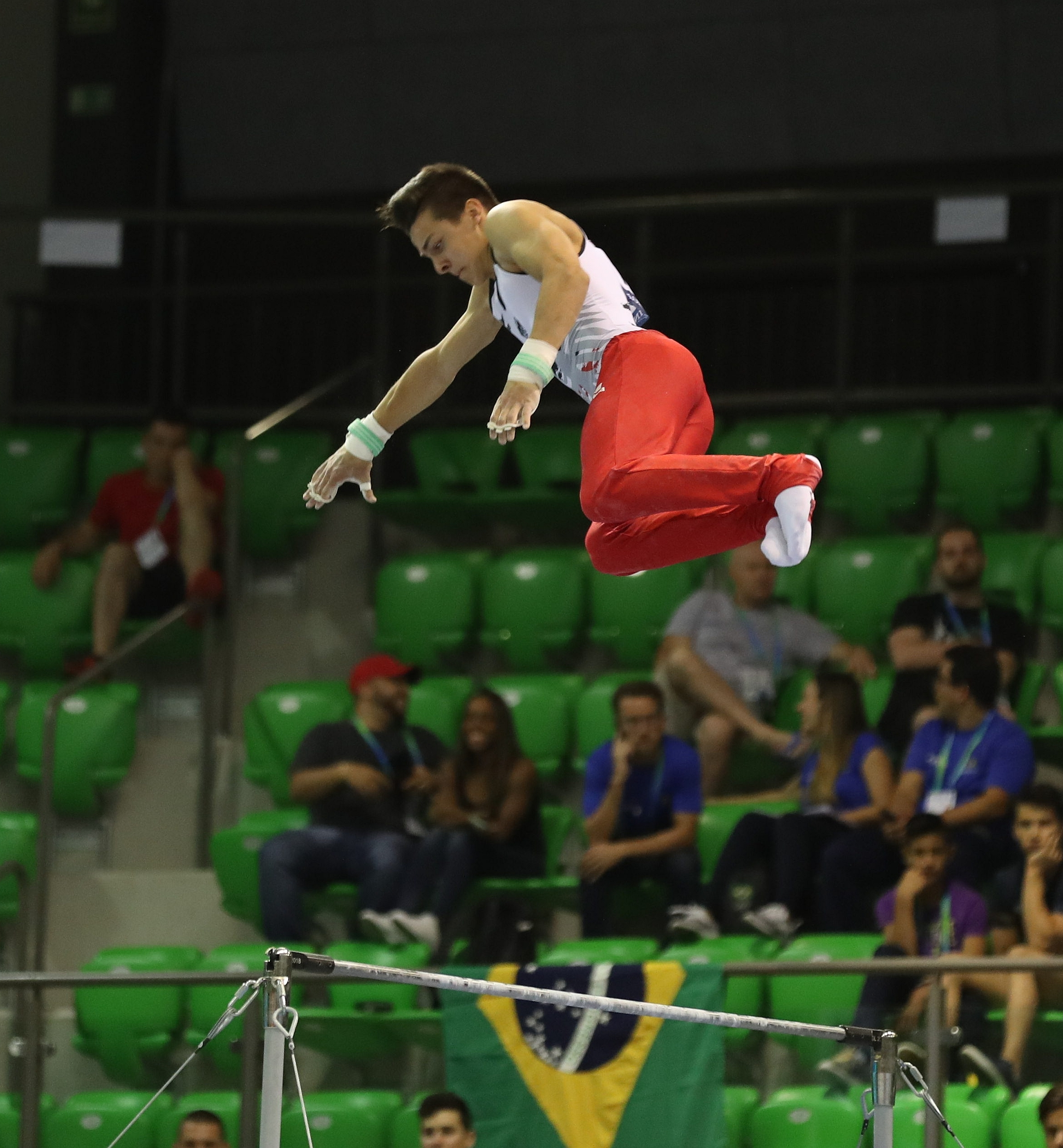

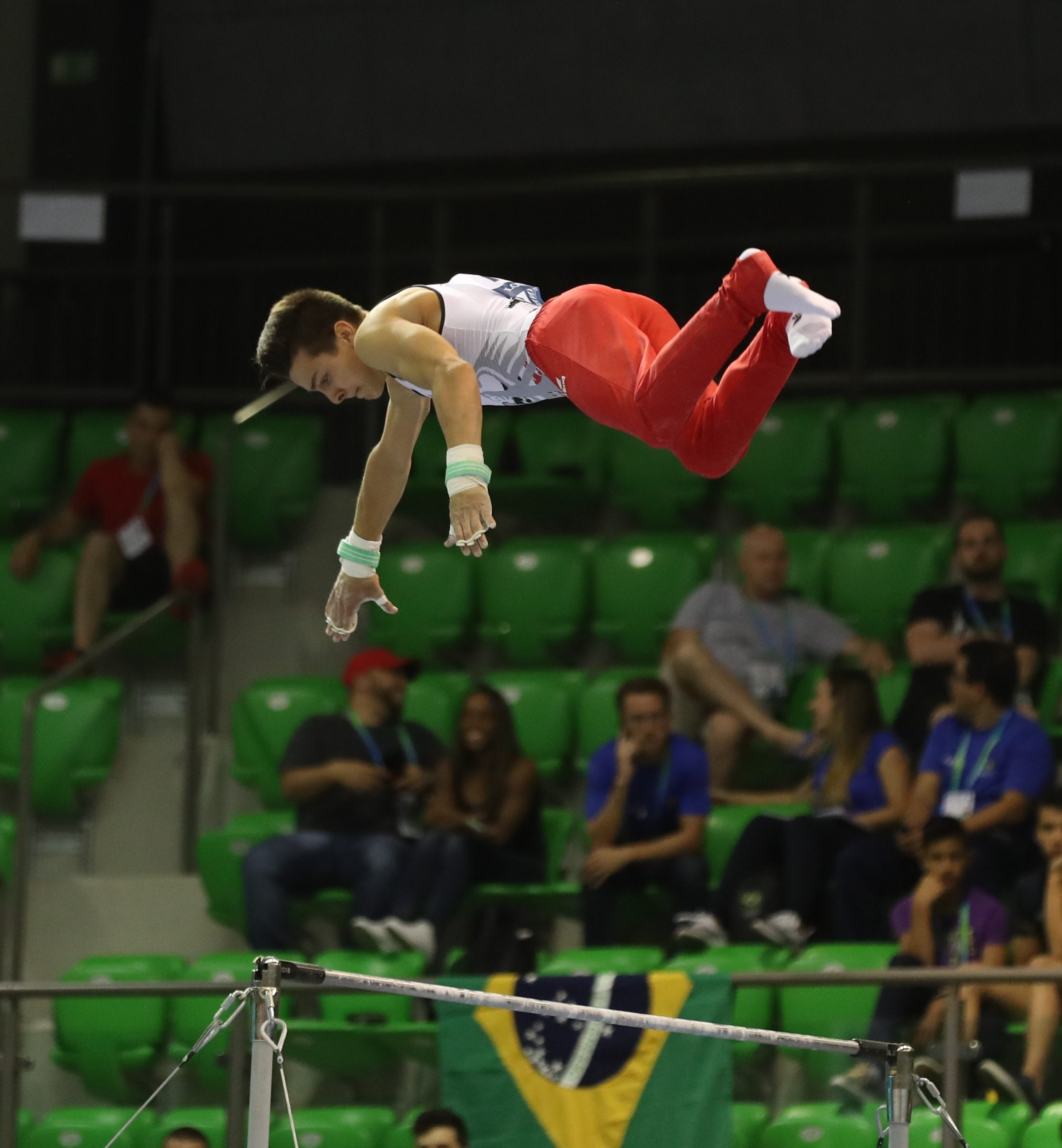

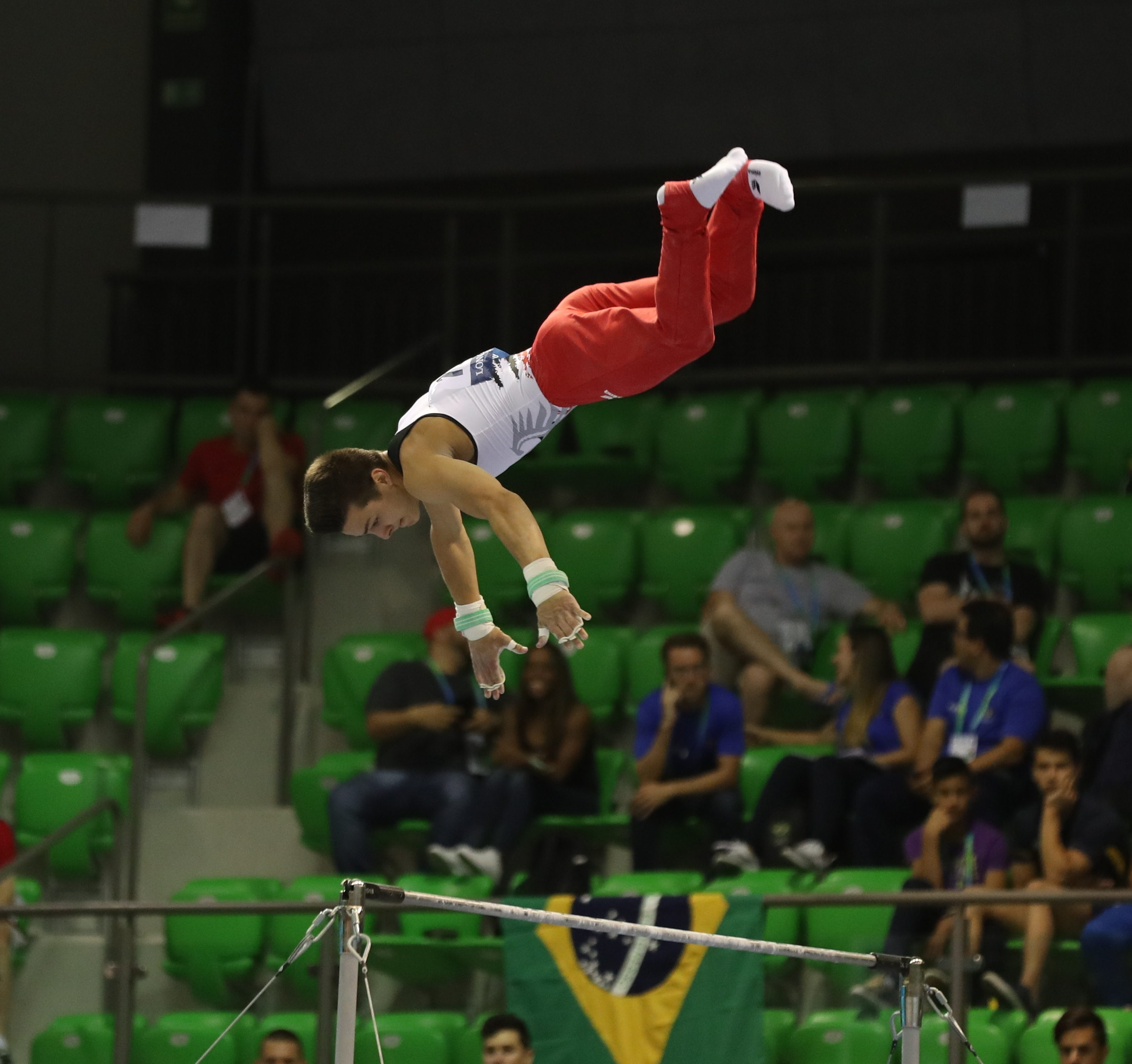

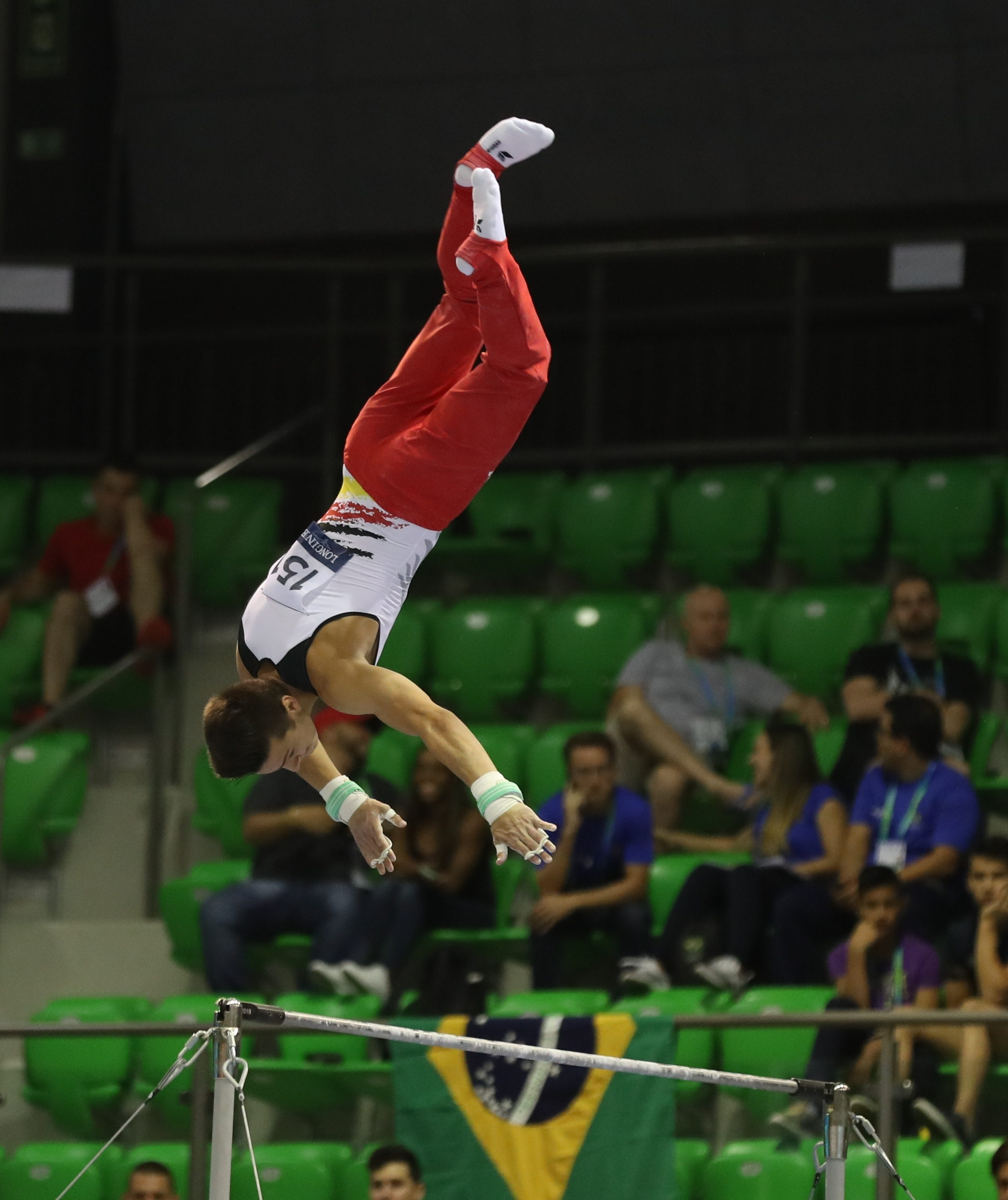

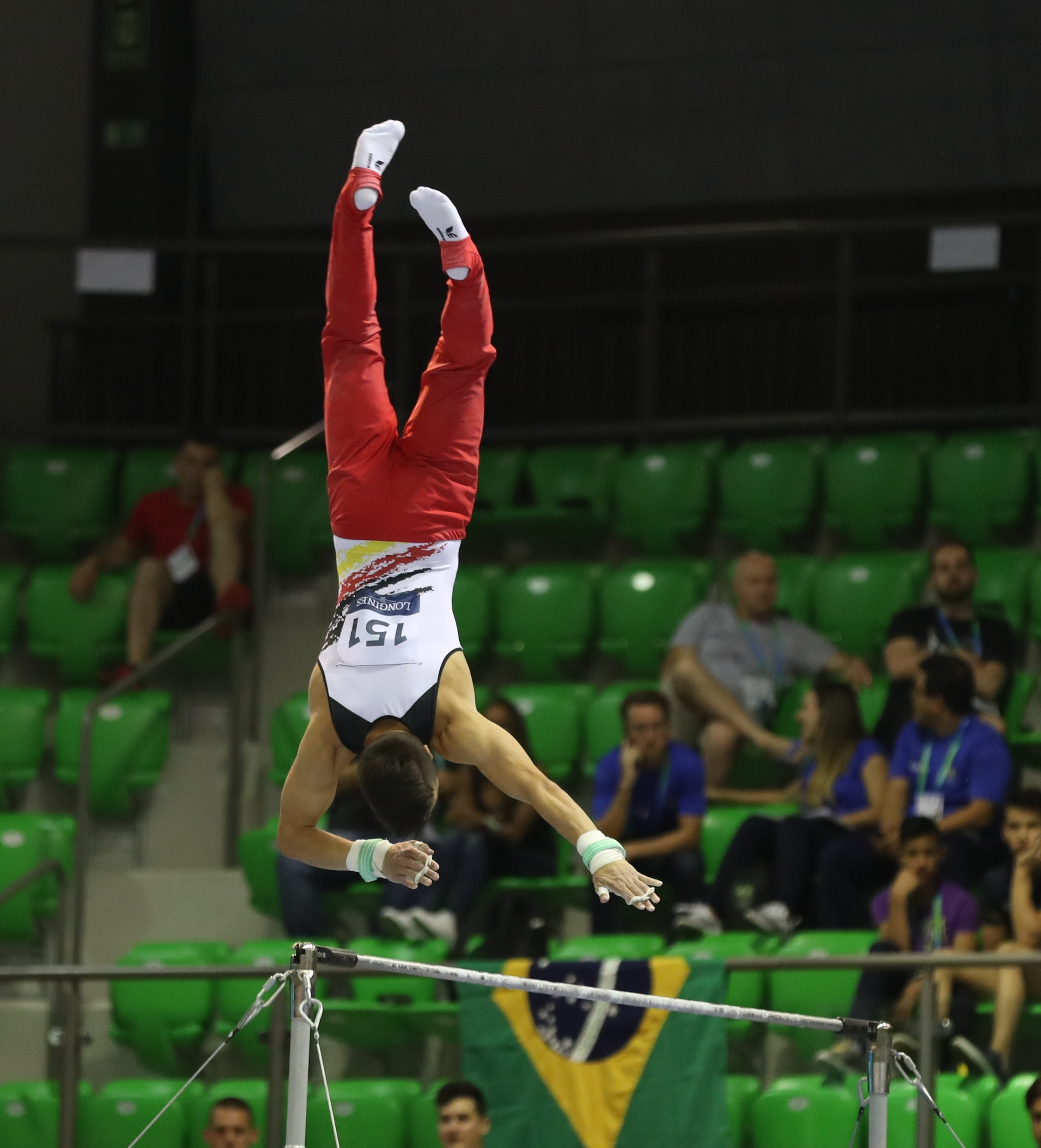

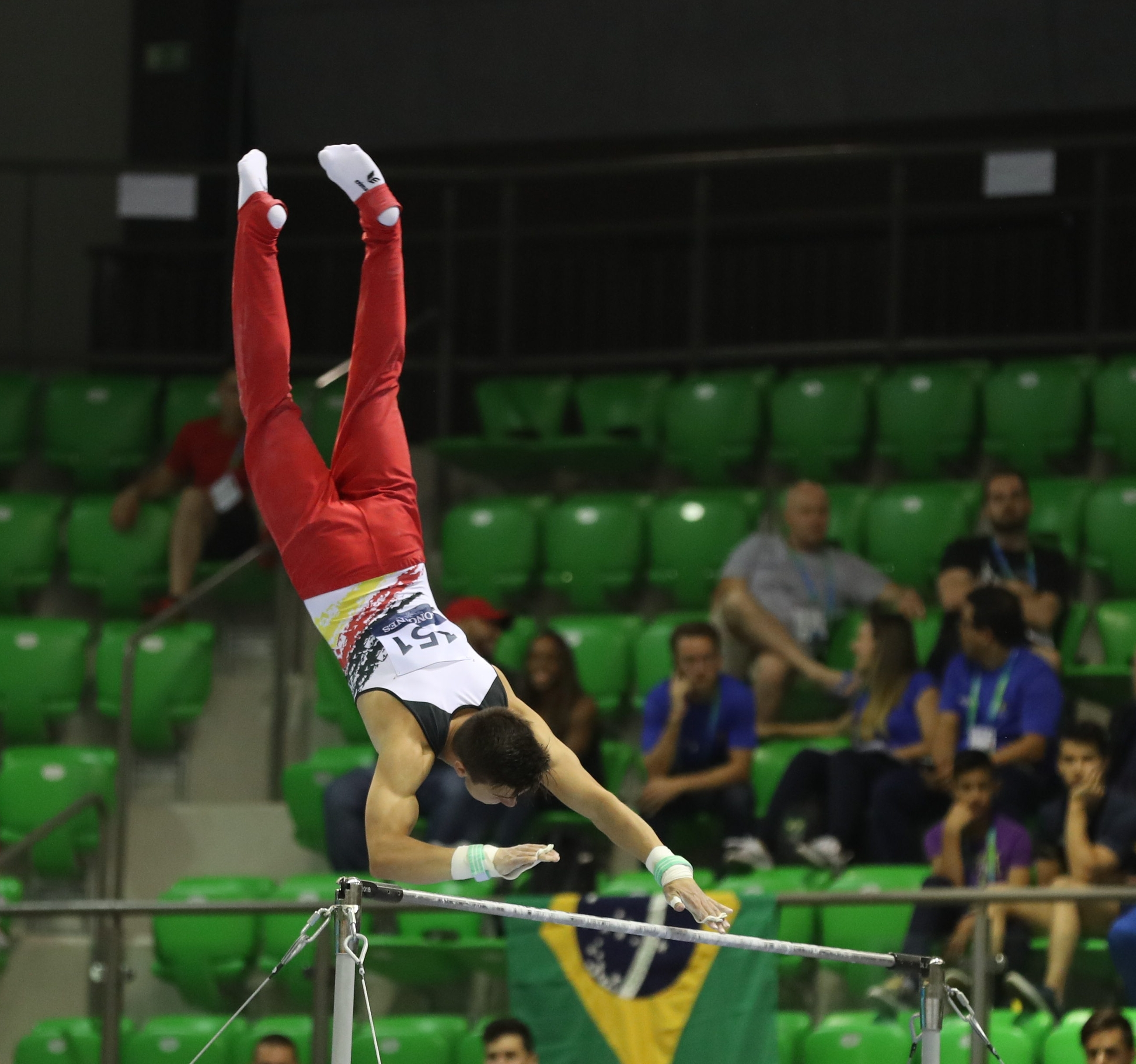

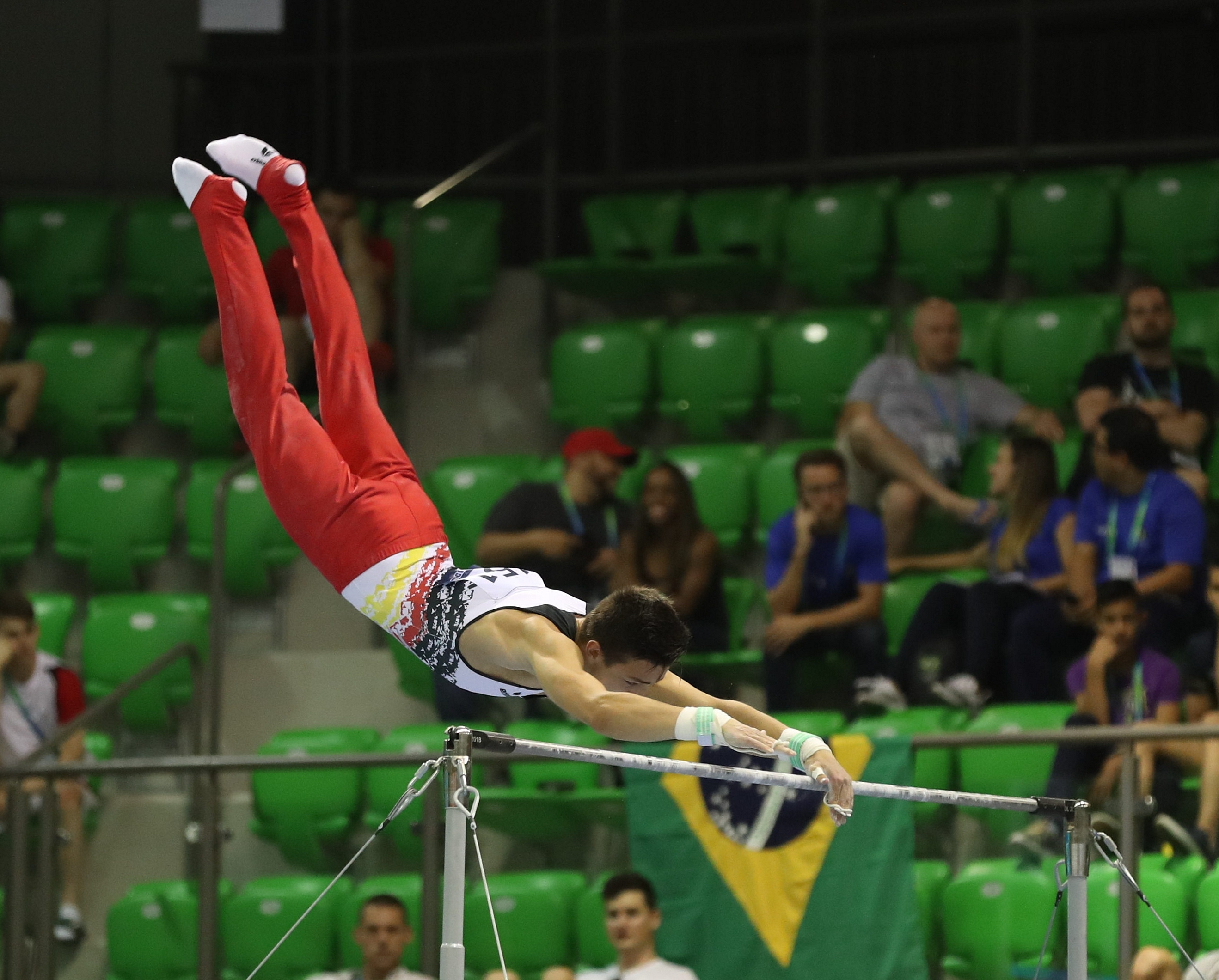

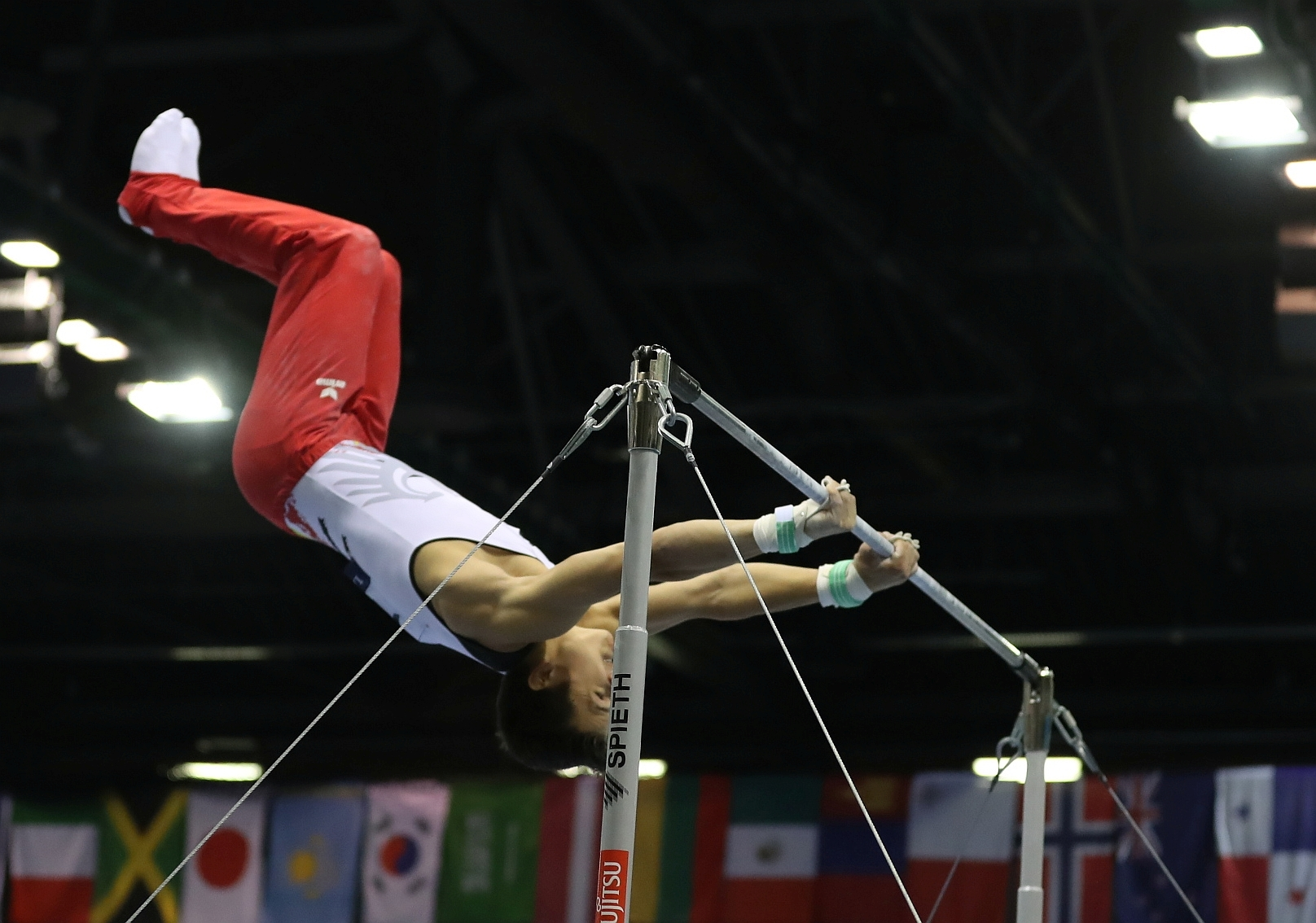
Performed by the same gymnast, different angle

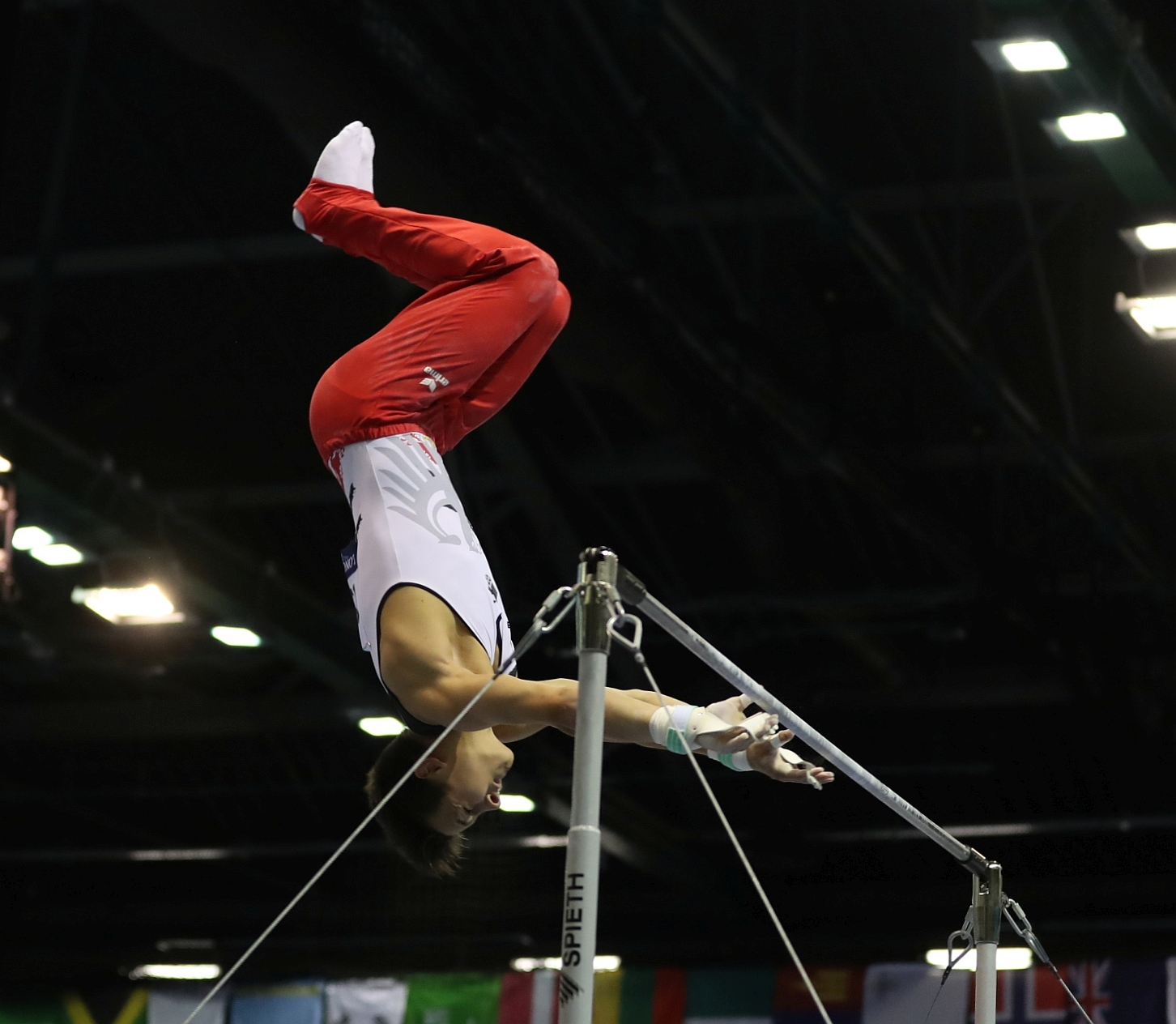

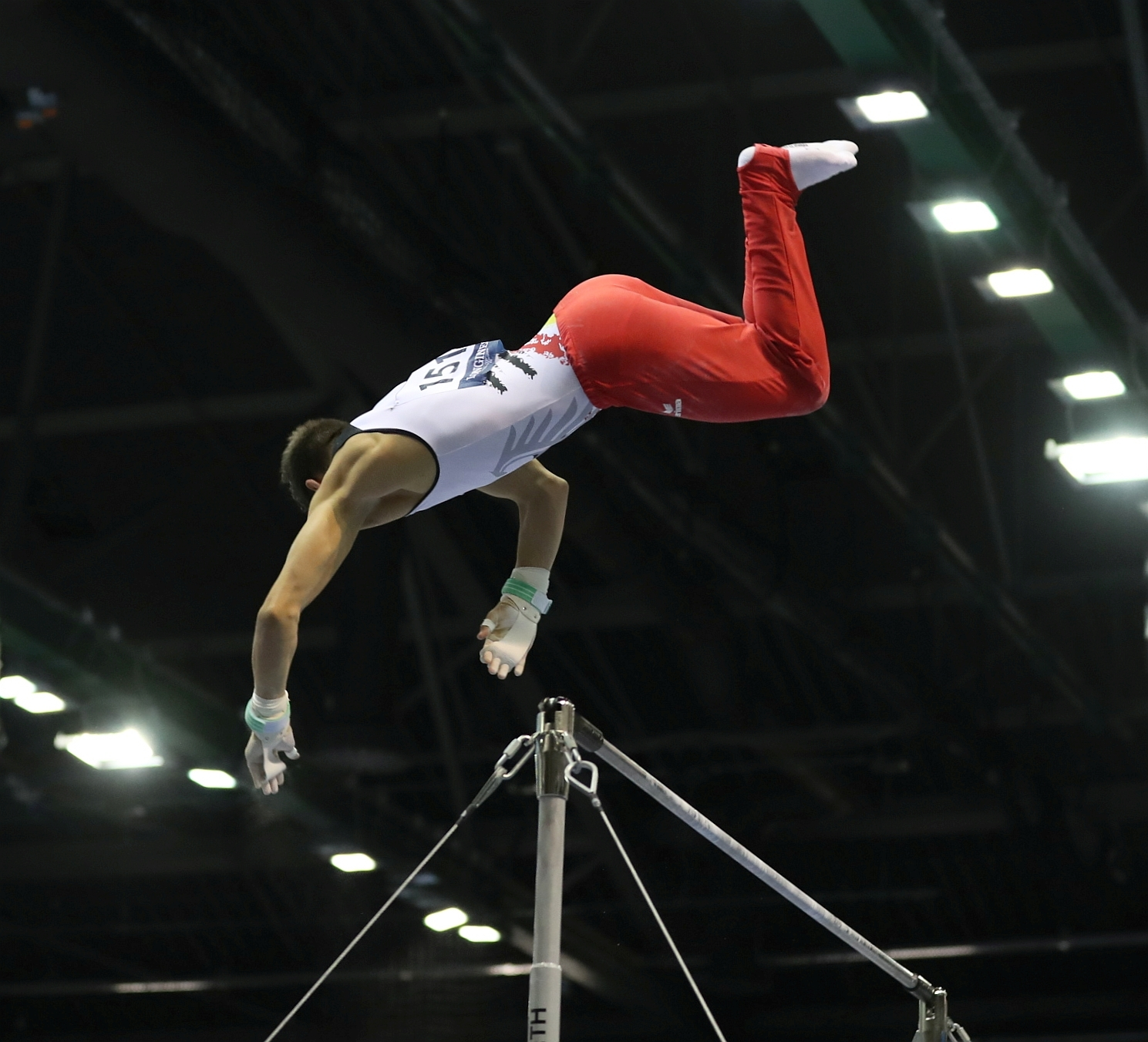

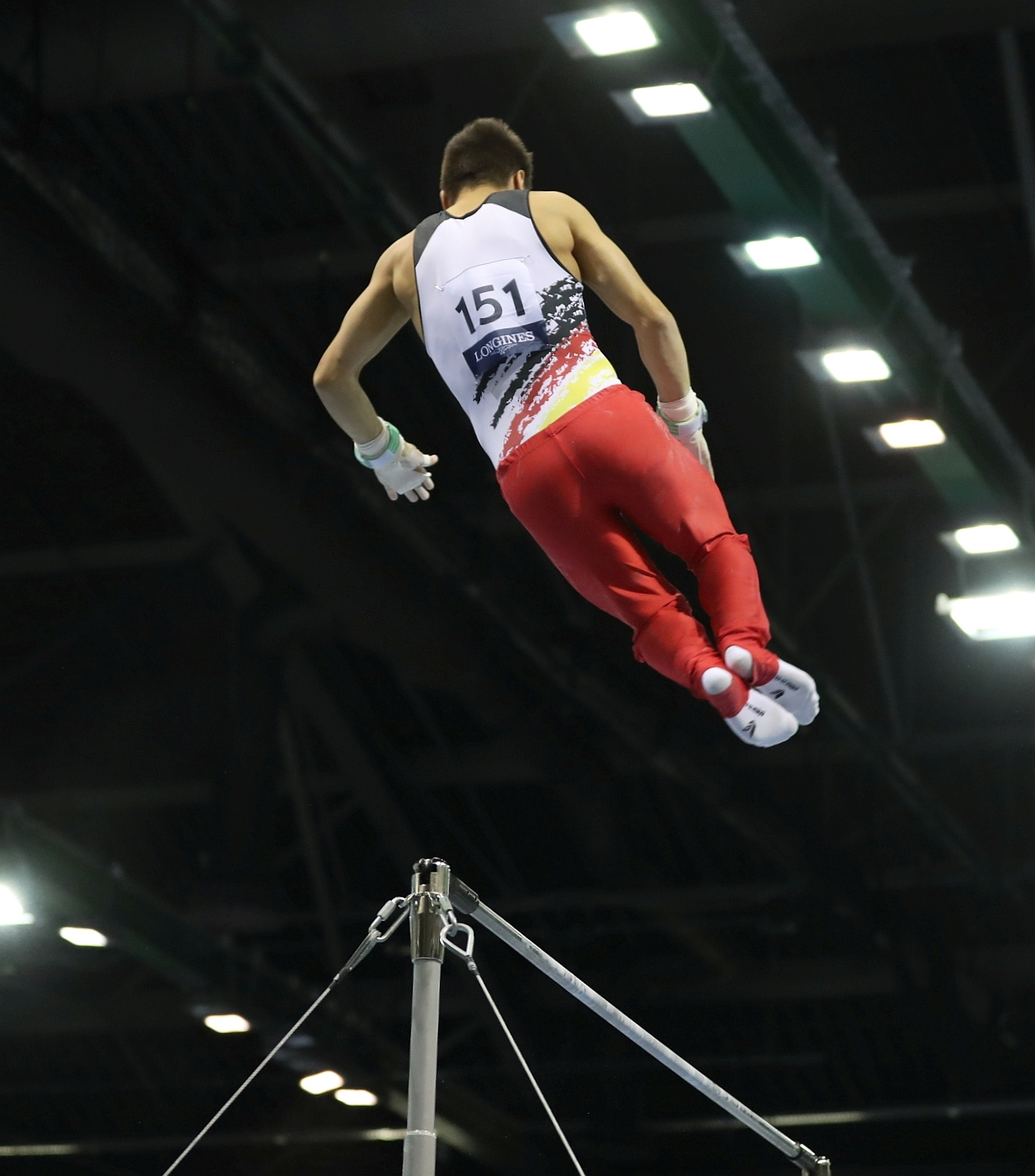

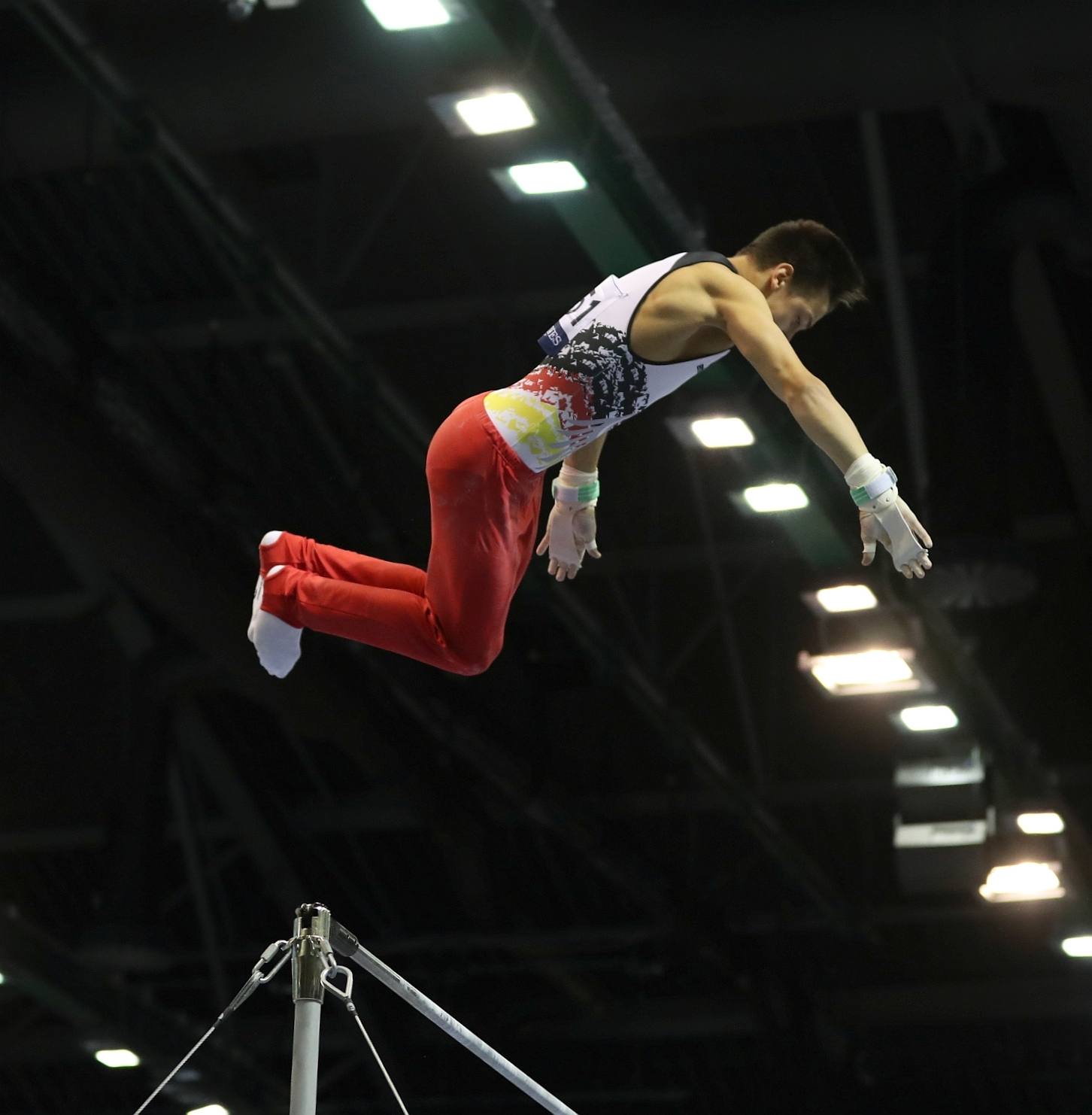

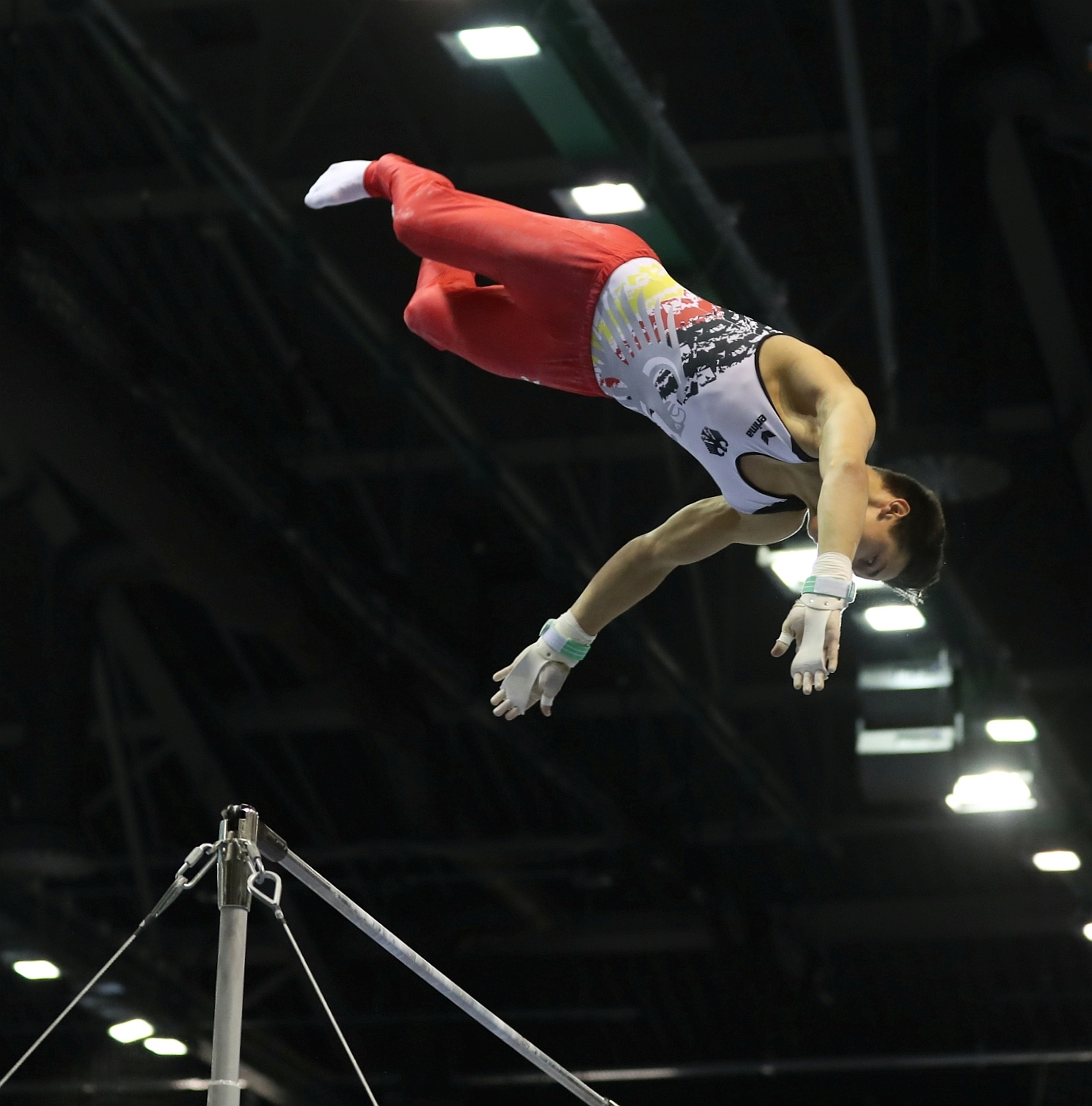

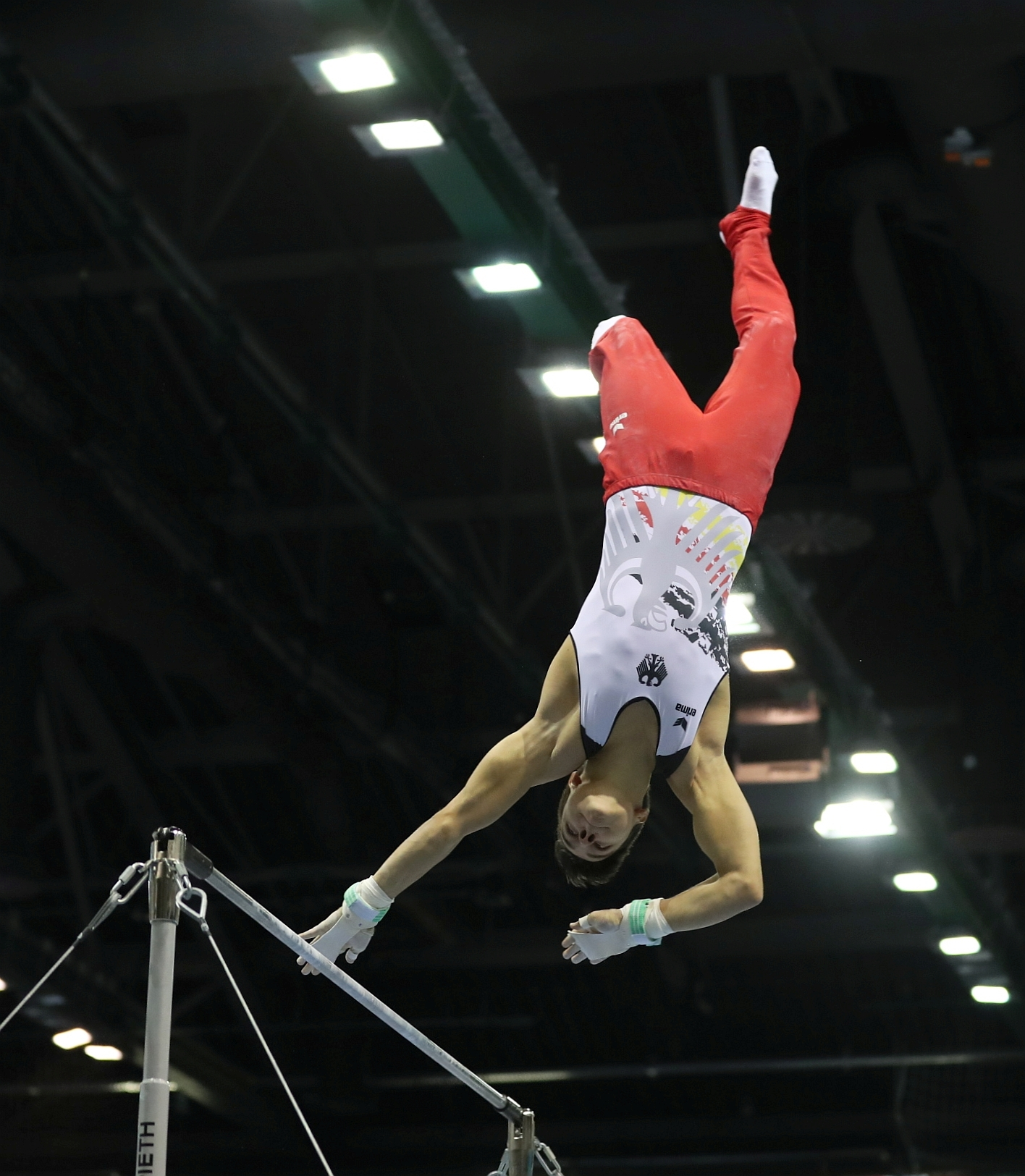

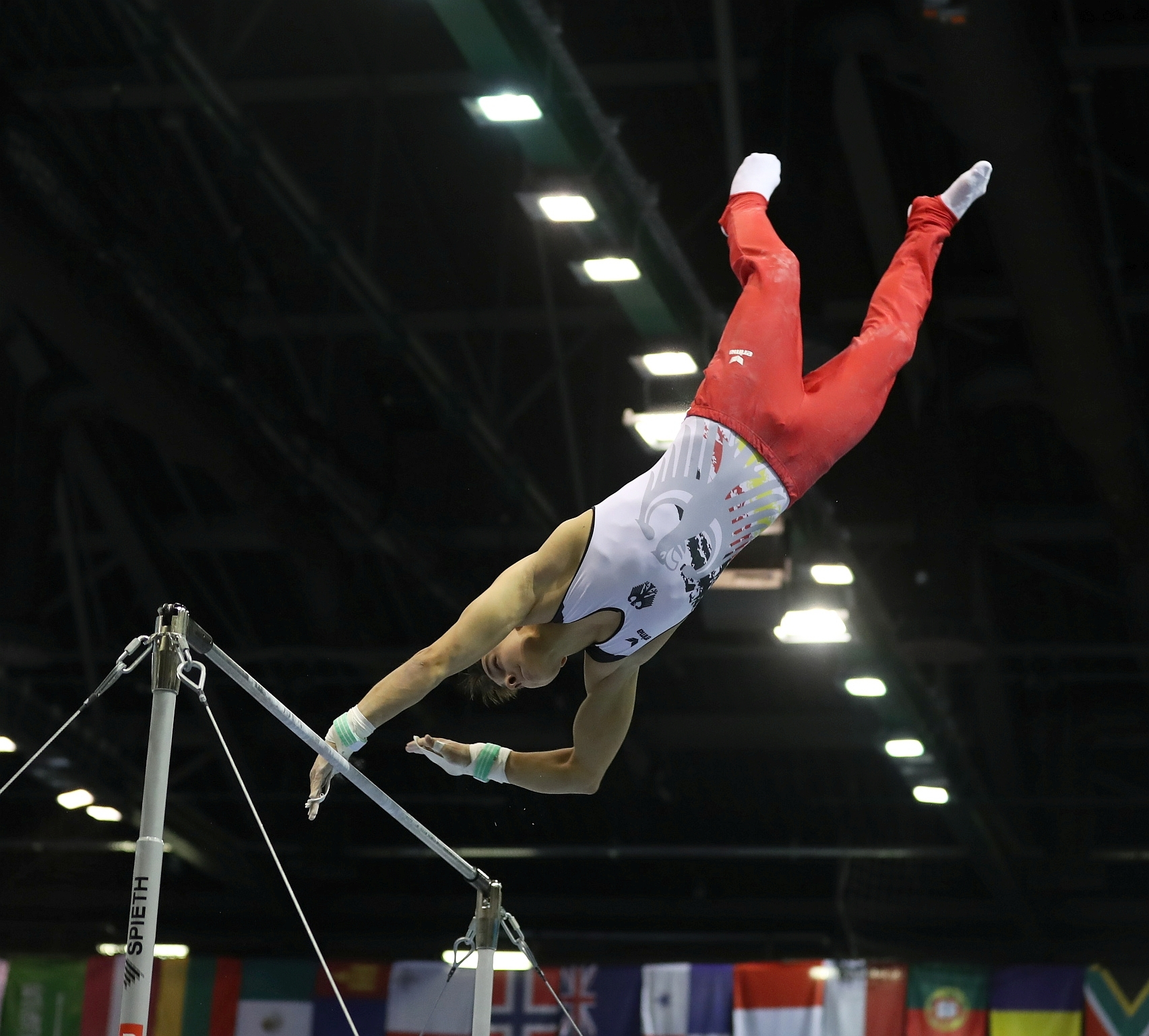

Execution of the Kolyvanov, starting with a circle

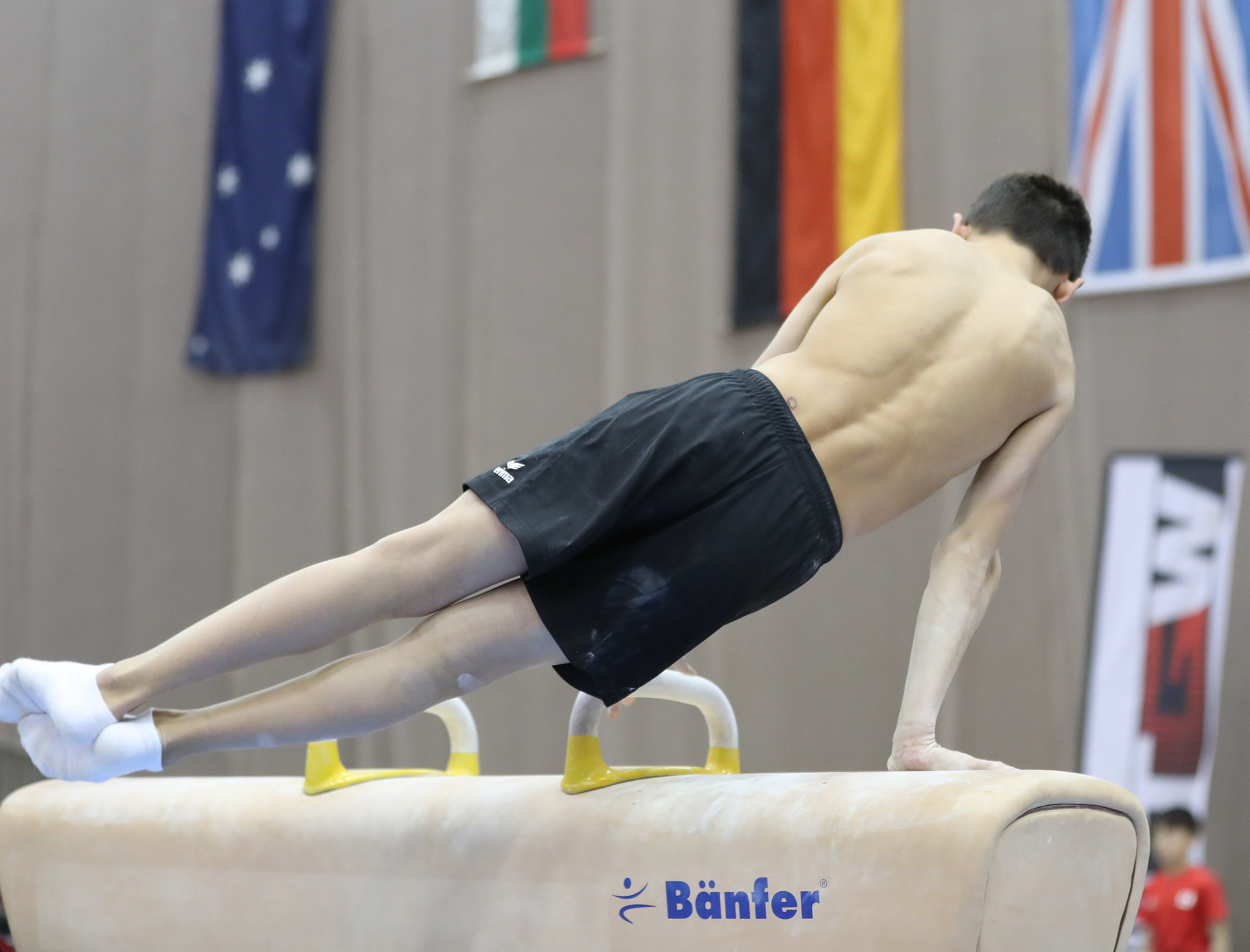
Performed by the young Timo Eder during the training at the Austrian Future Cup 2018

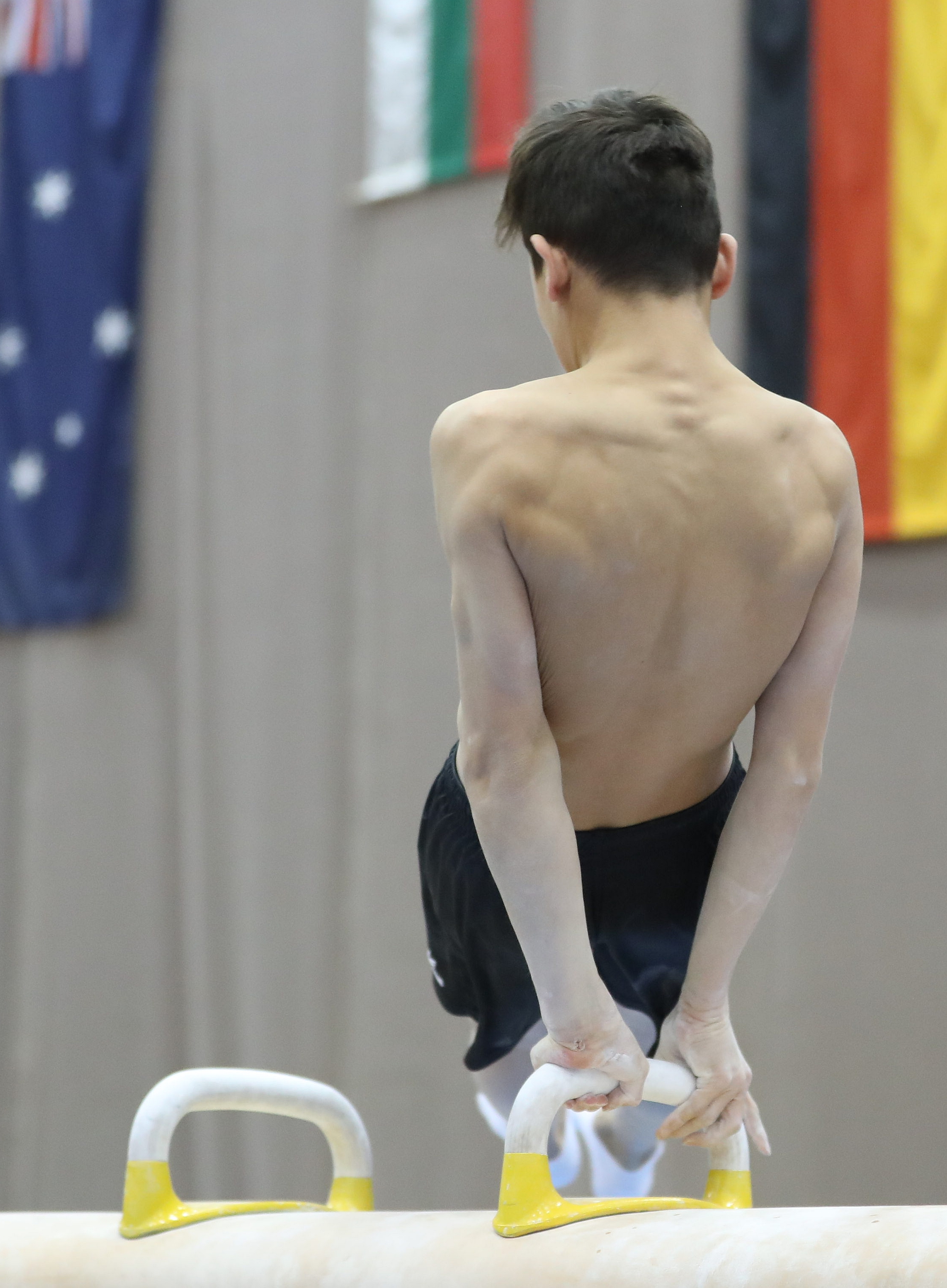

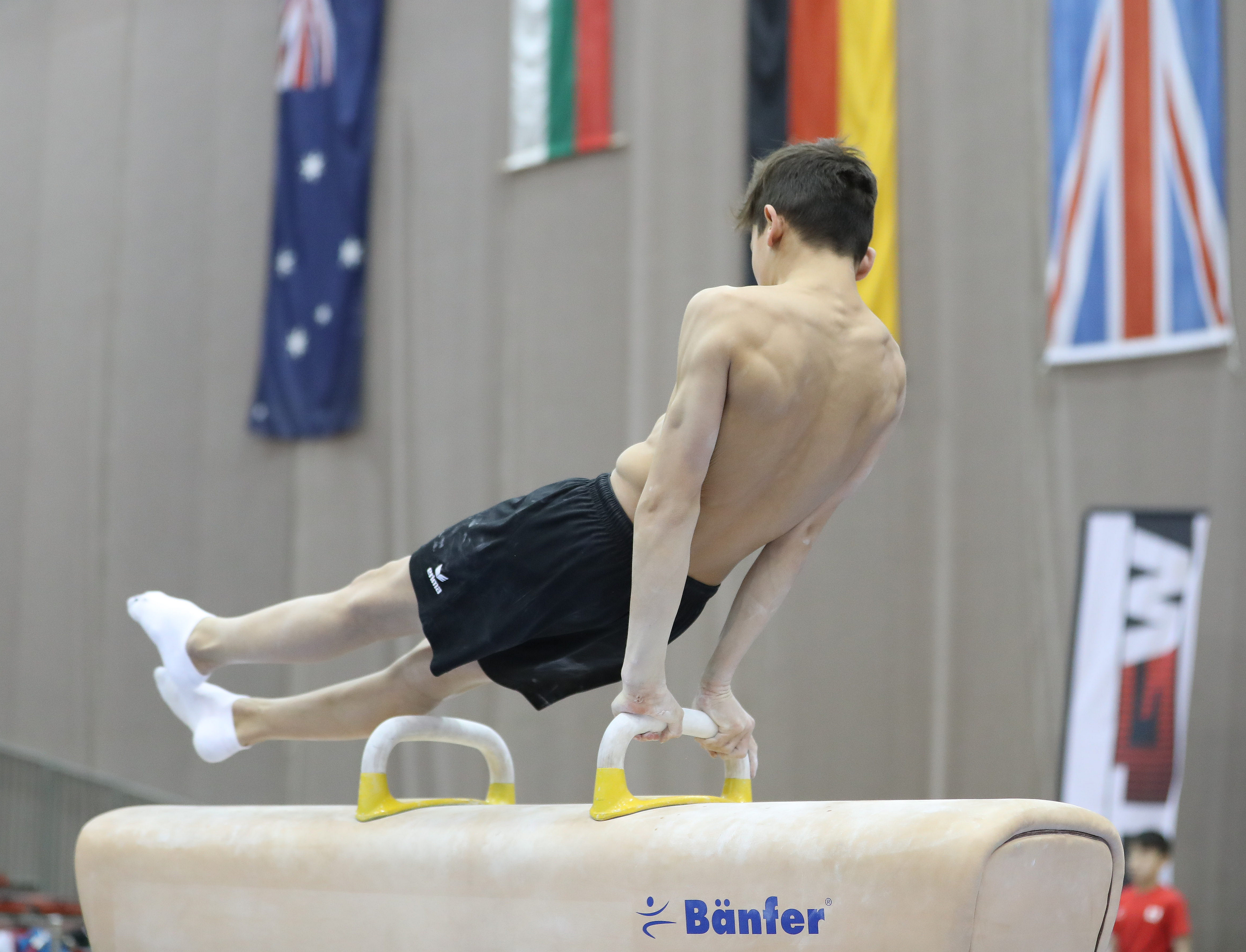

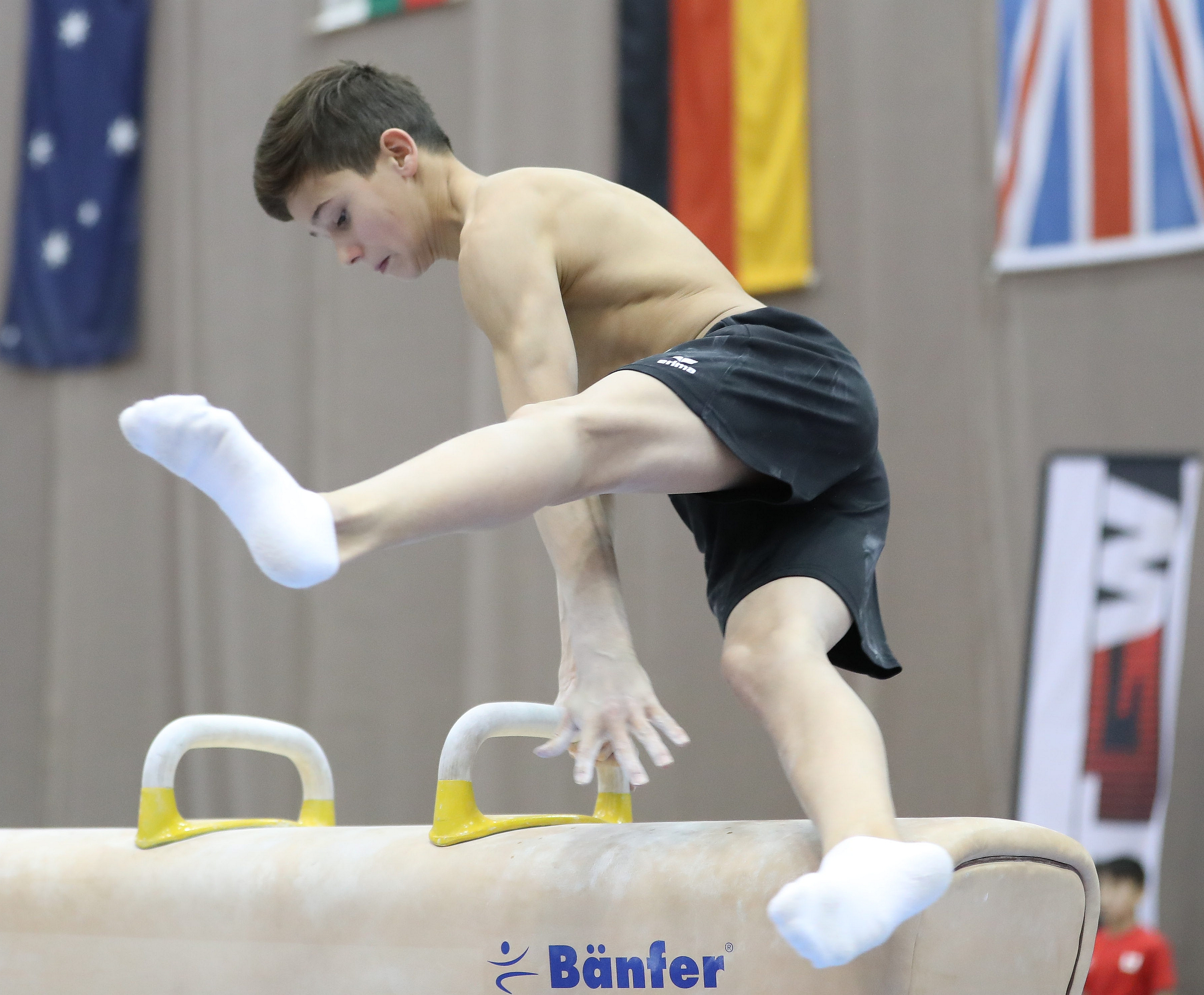

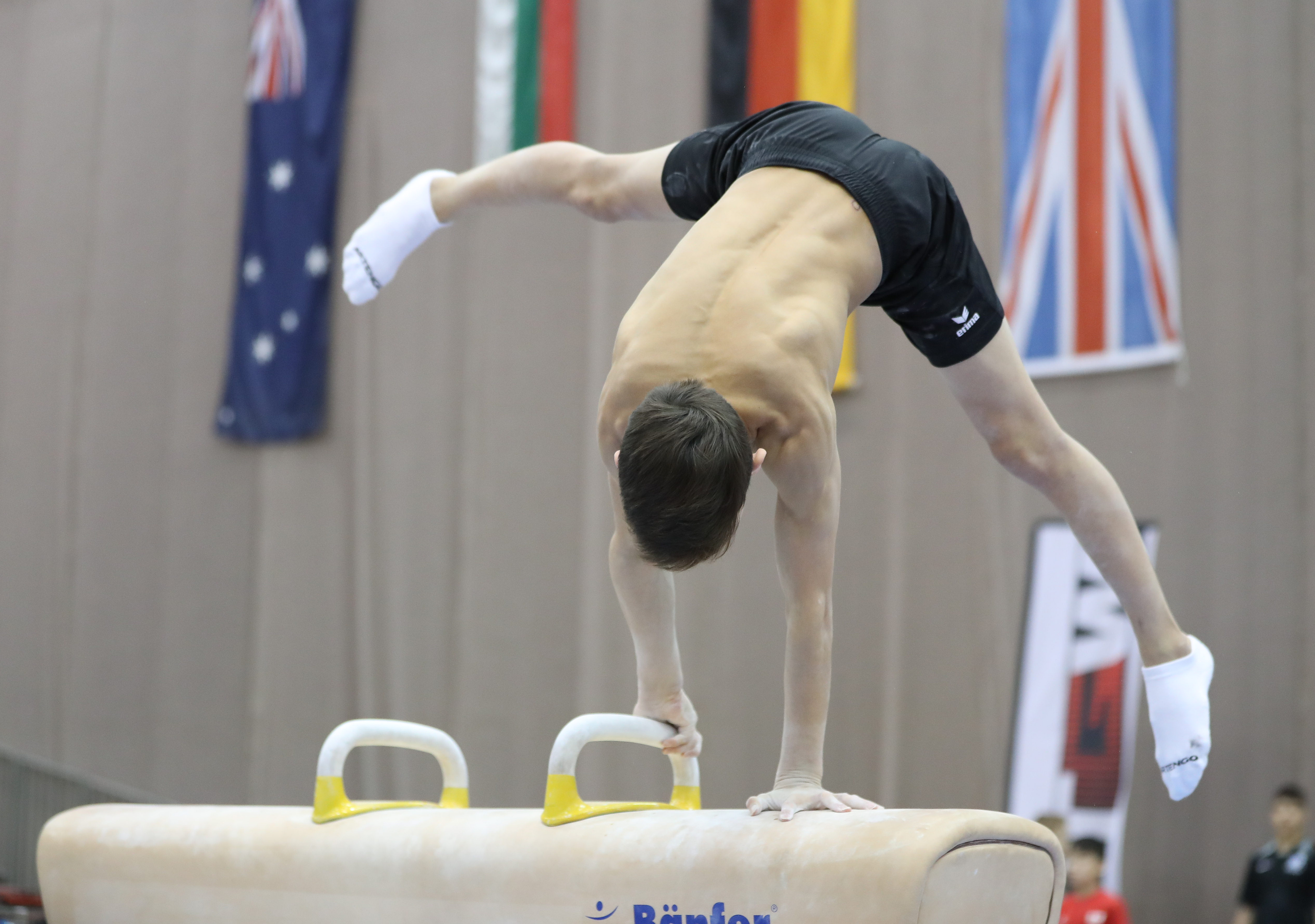

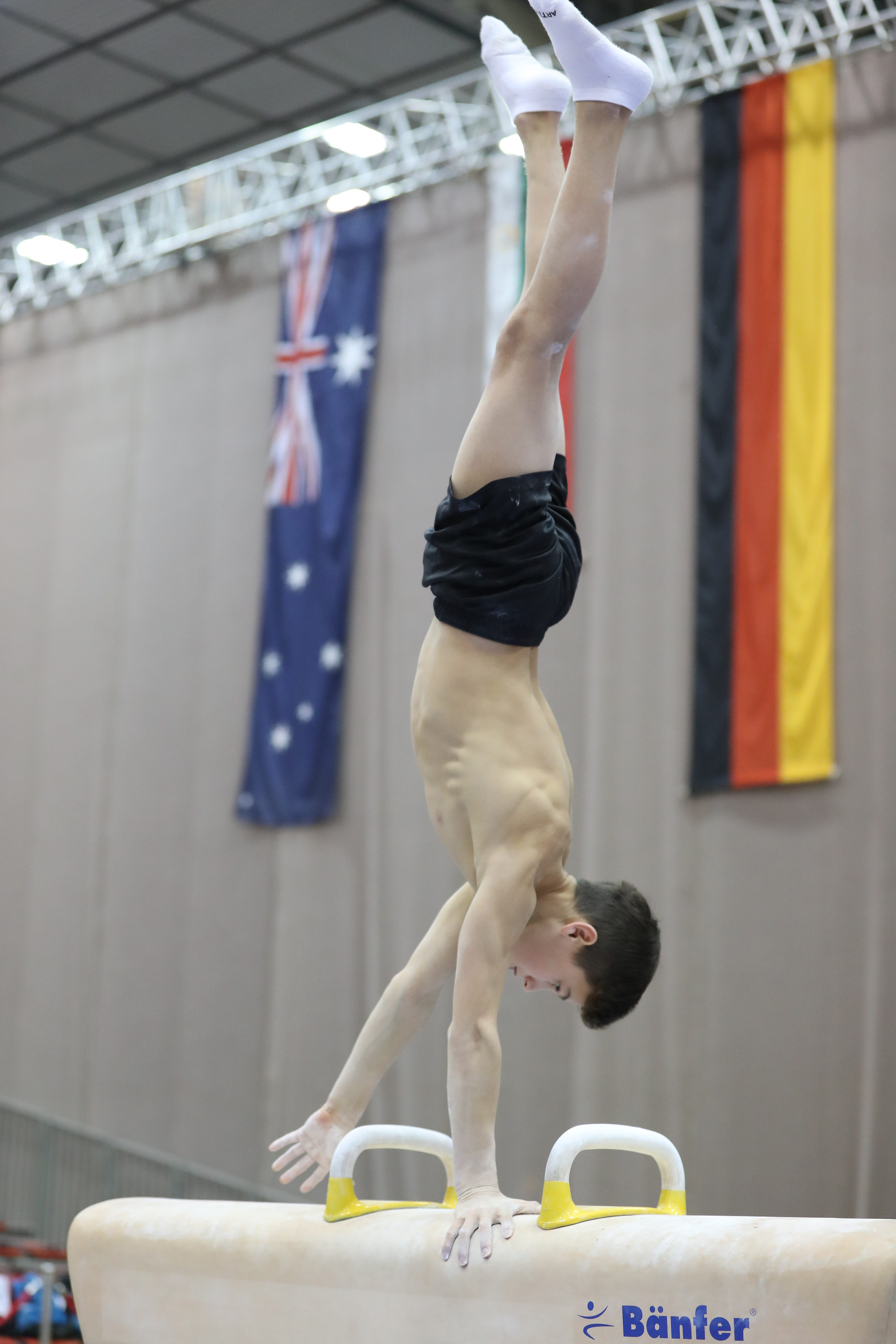

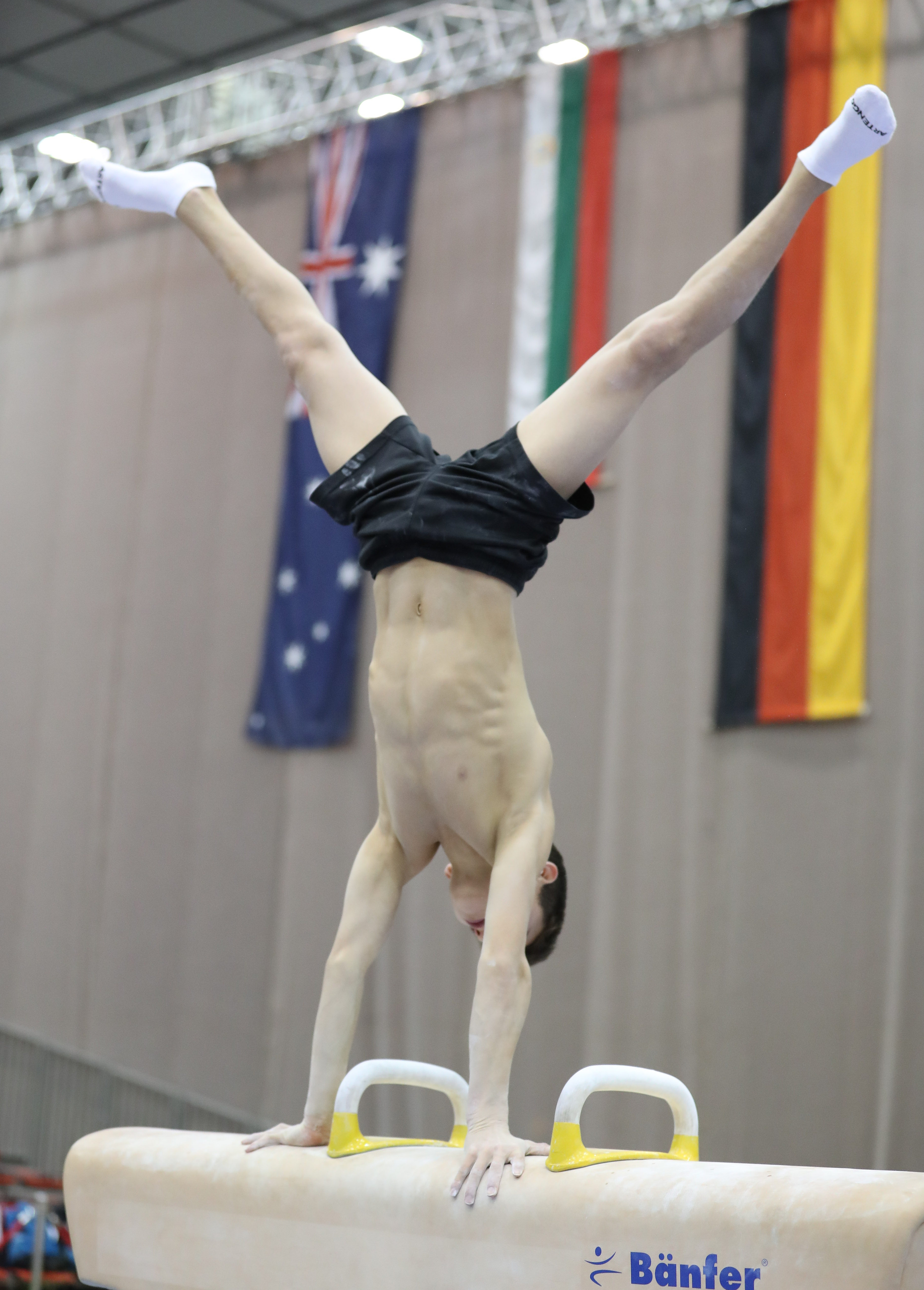

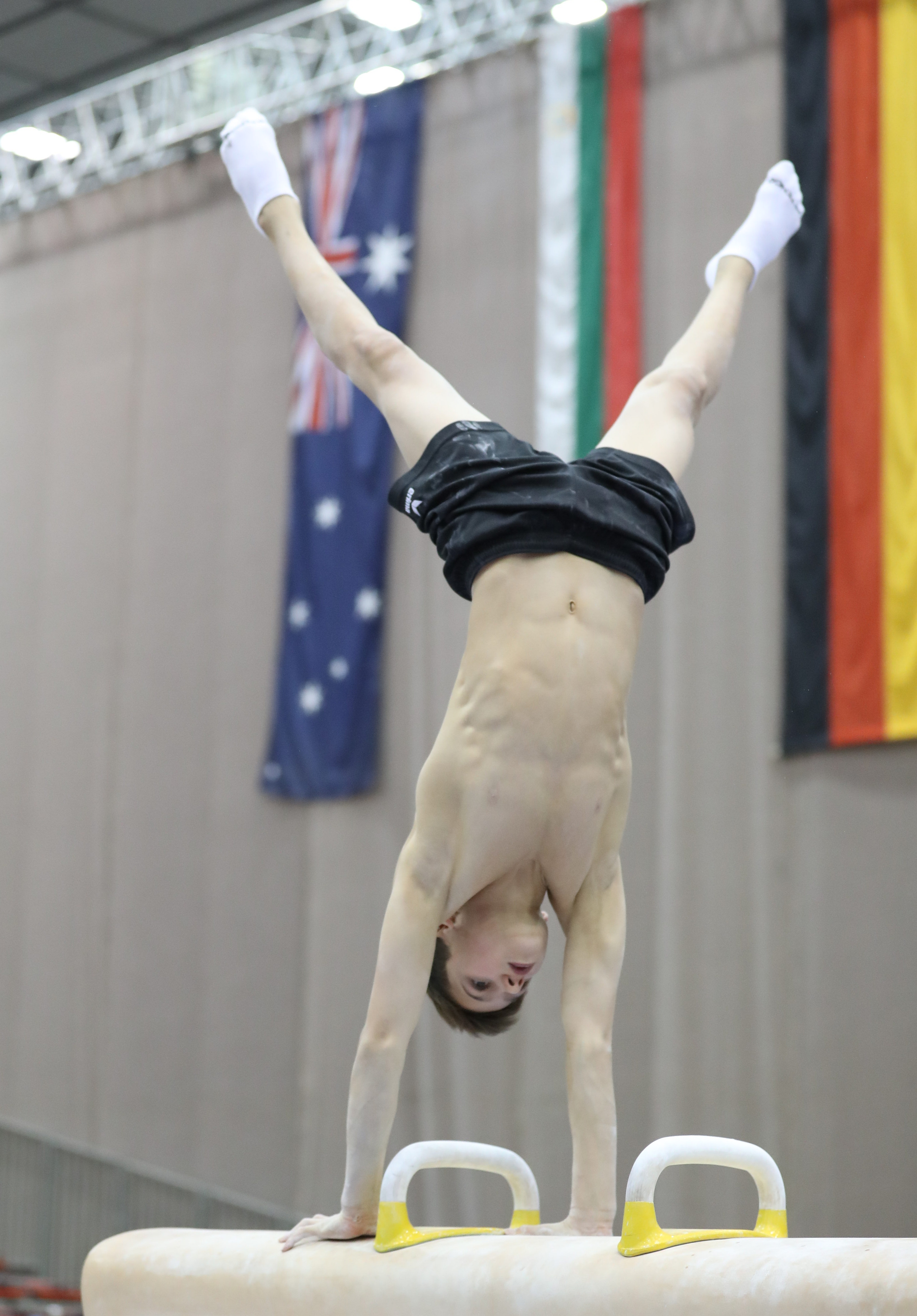

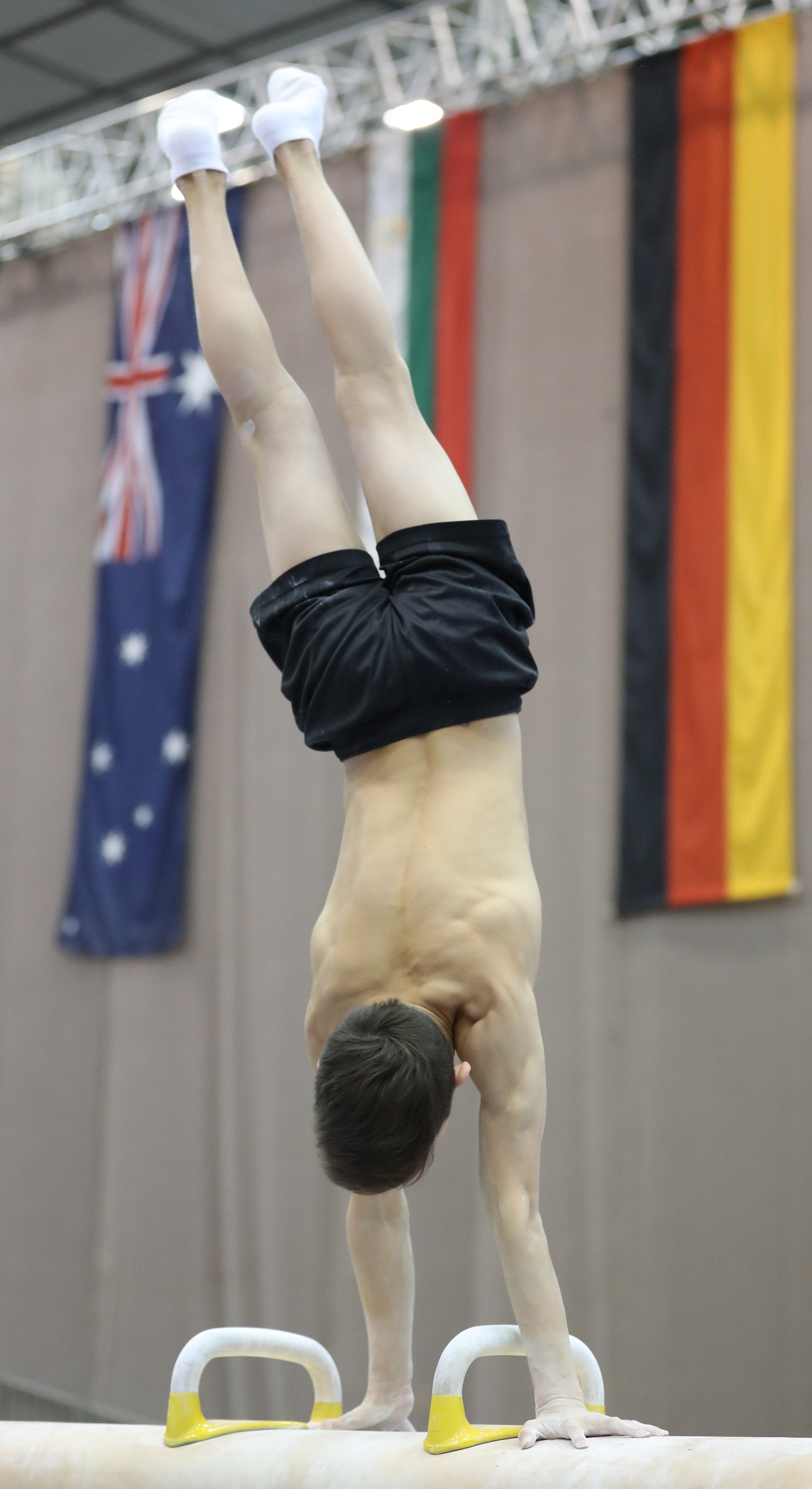

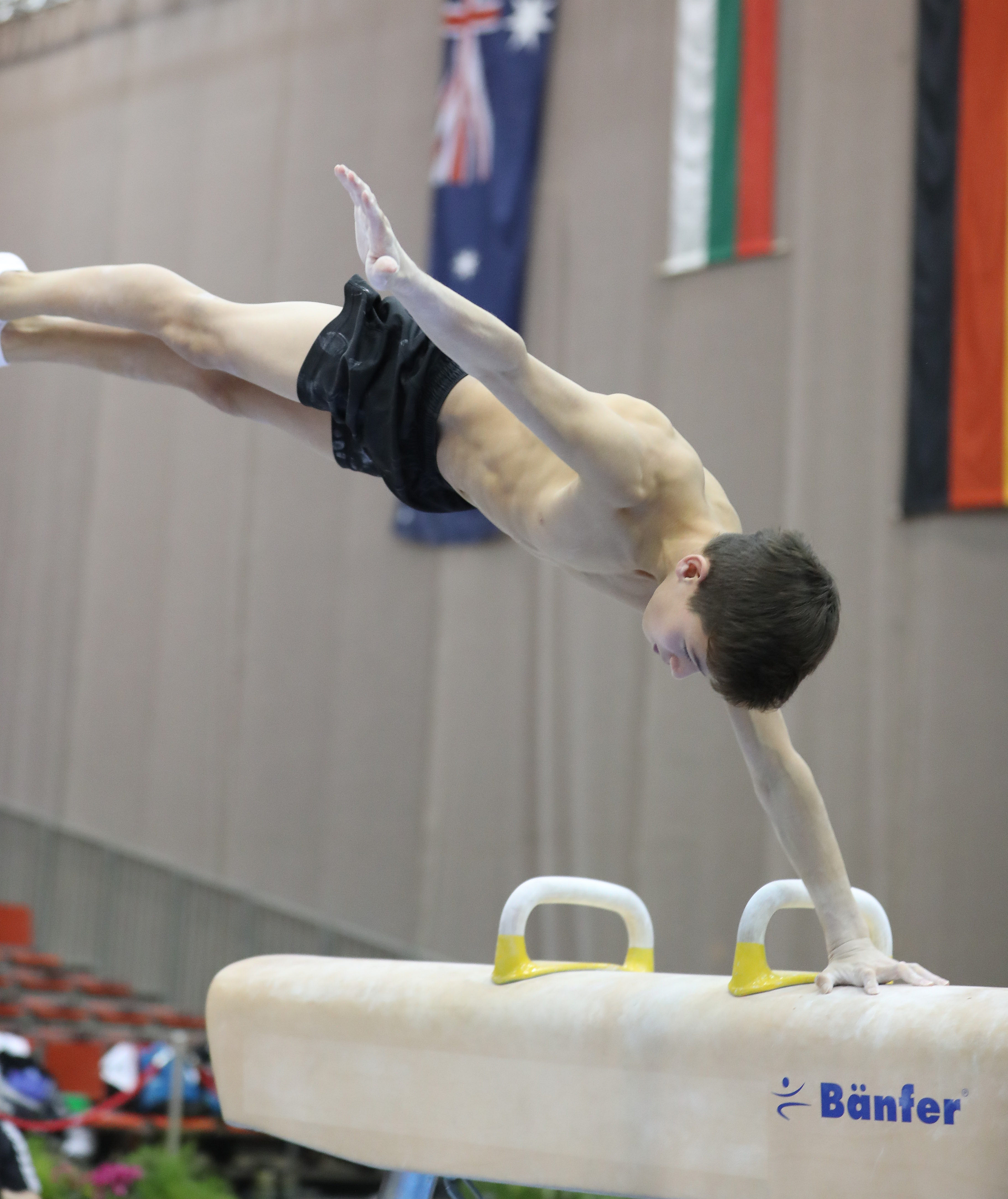

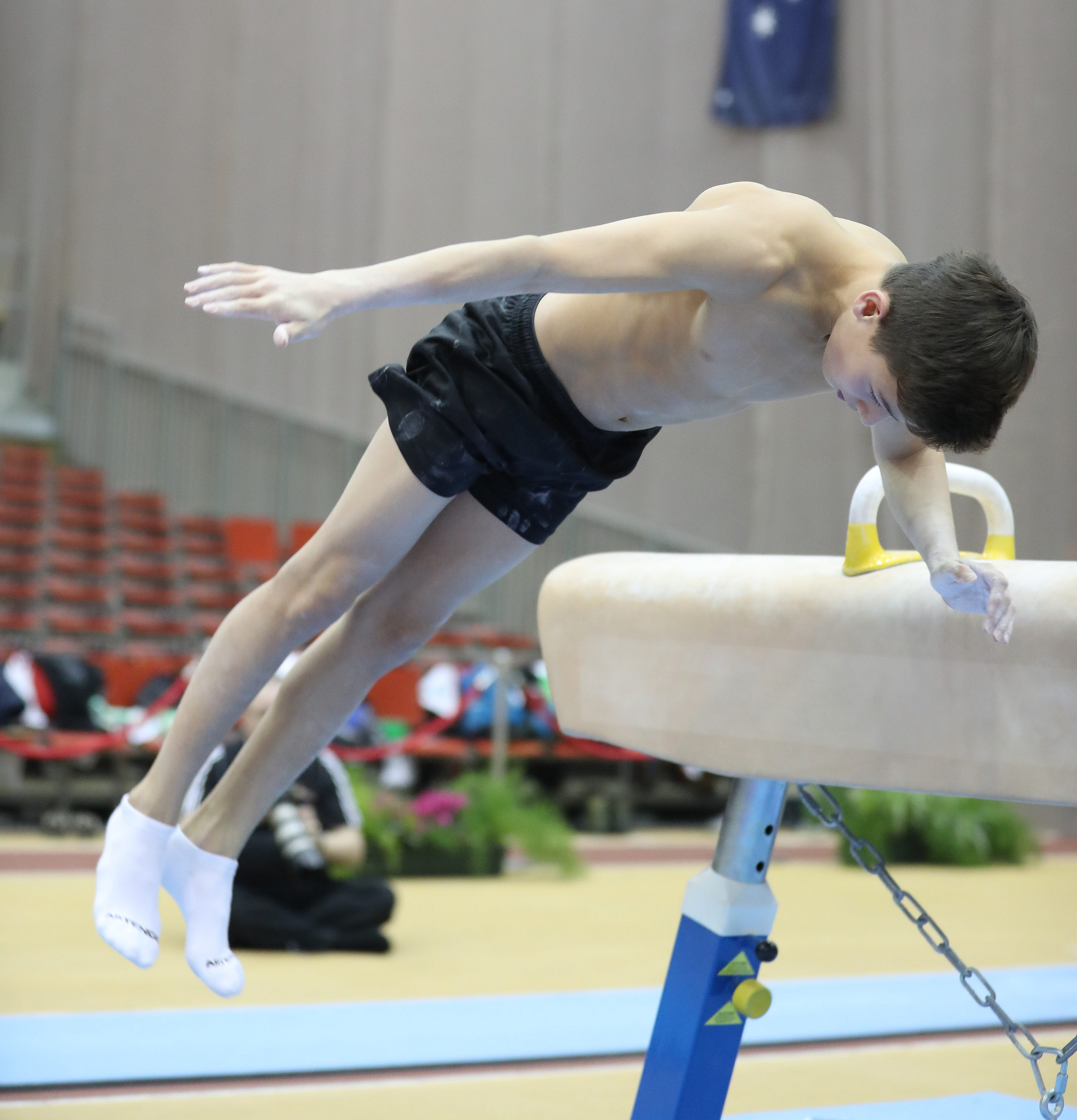

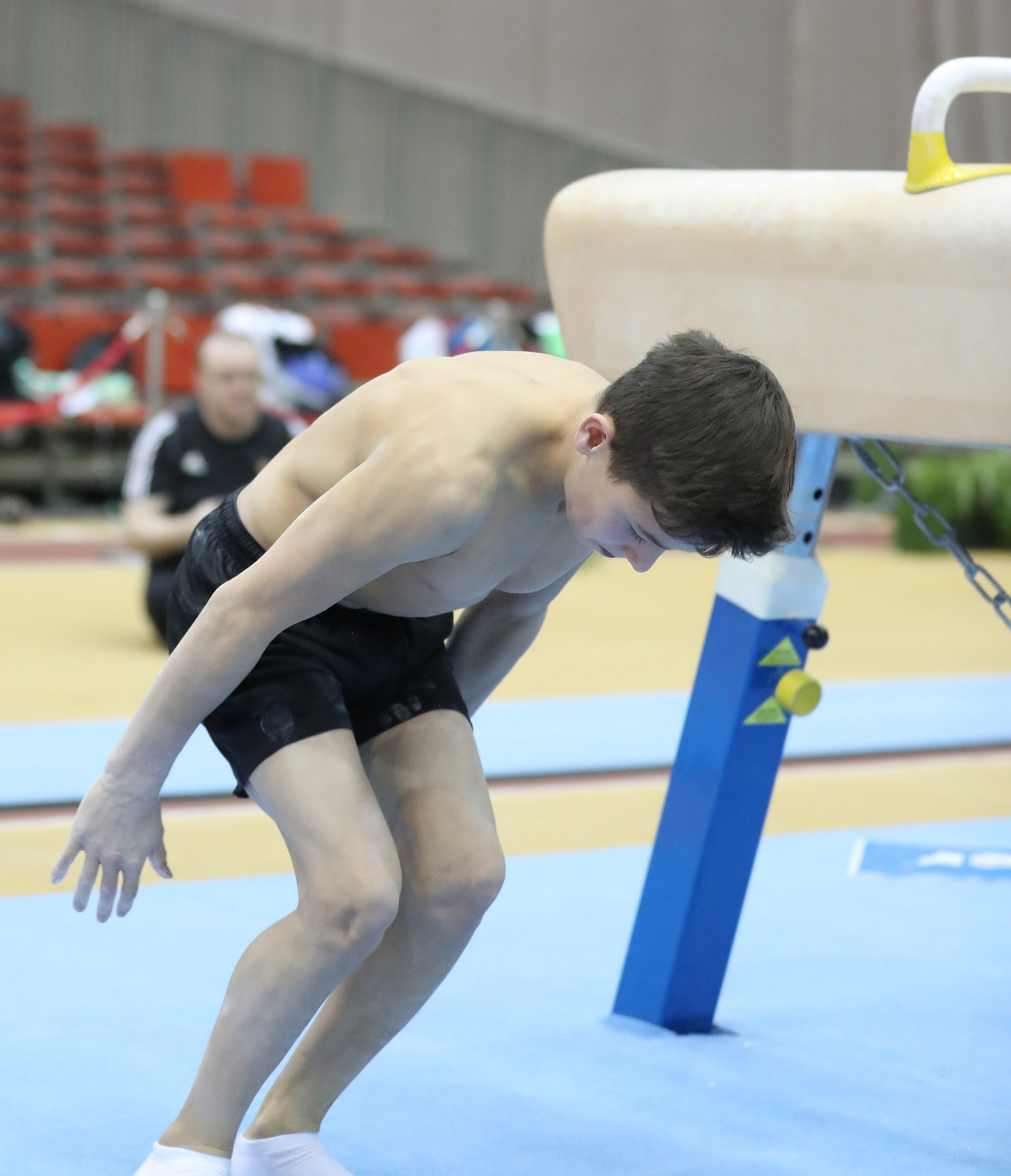

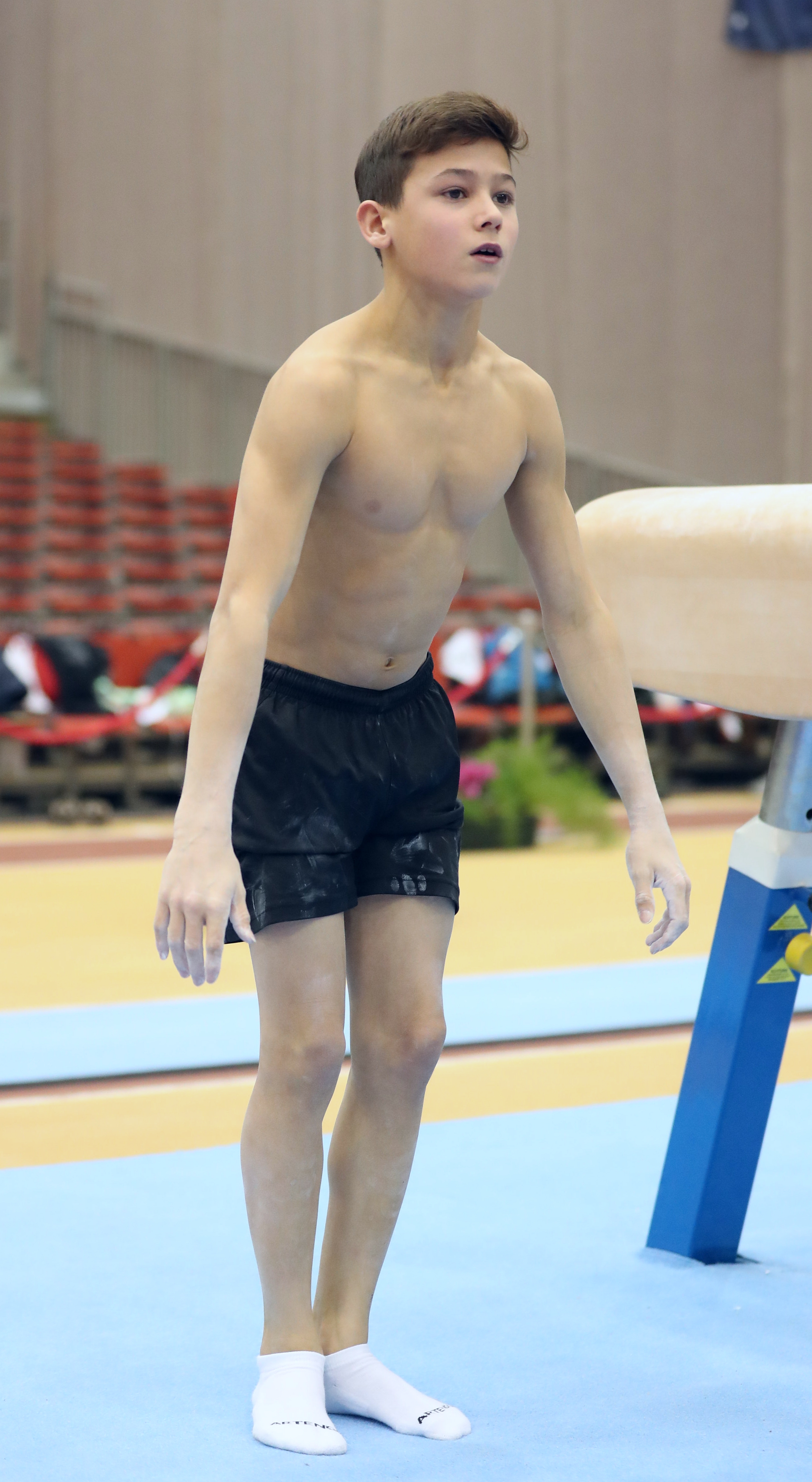

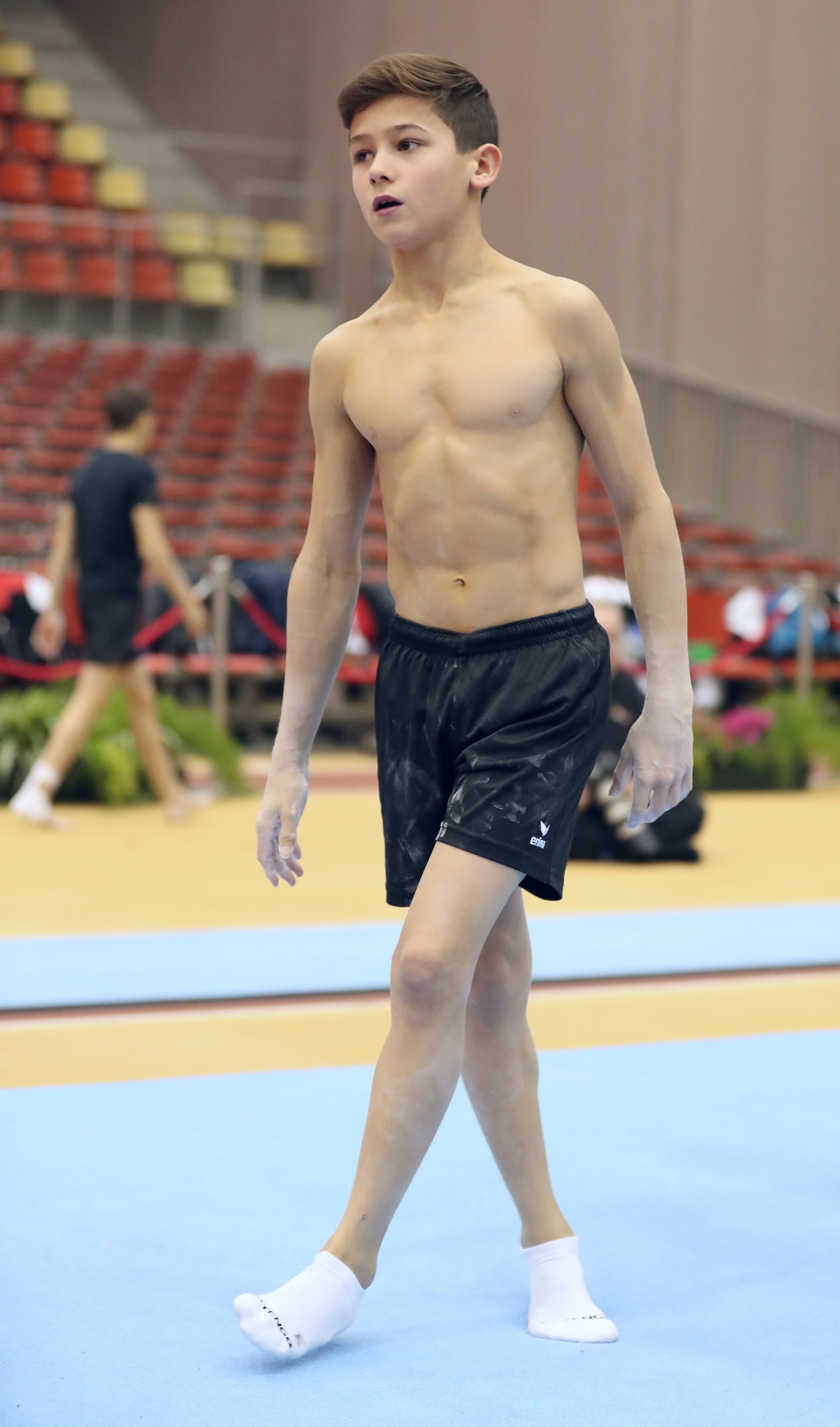

== L ==
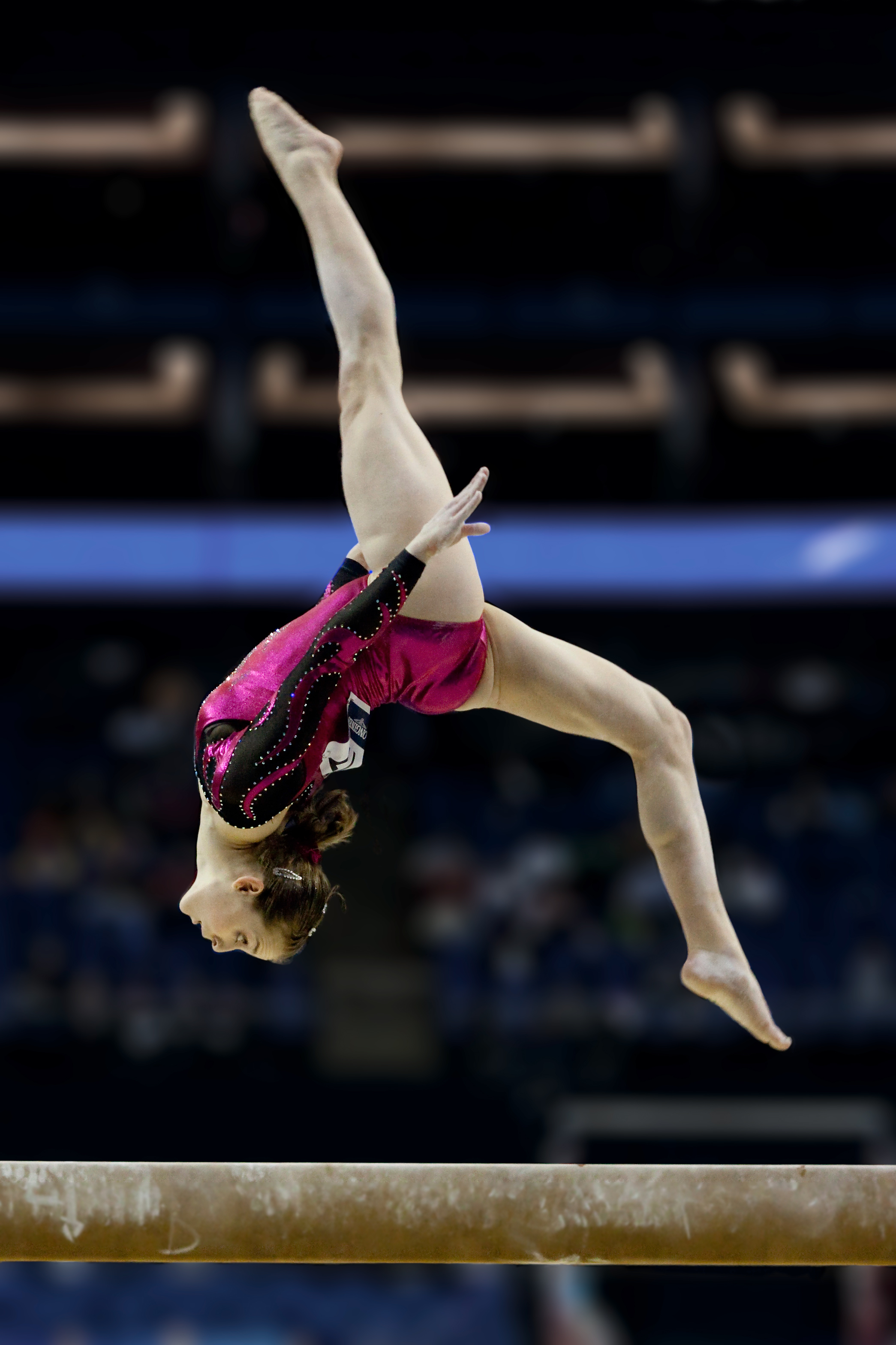
Lauren Mitchell performing a layout step-out on the balance beam.

Layout
A position in which the gymnast's body is completely stretched, toes pointed and legs straight. A layout in tumbling, vault, or balance beam is a salto performed in this position. In some countries, layout saltos are referred to as "straights" (e.g., "he performed a double straight").
Leotard
A piece of clothing that comes in a variety of colors, shapes and sizes, and is used for gymnastics workouts and competitions.
L-sit

== M ==
Manna
A strength move pressing with the hands where the legs and hips are raised until the hips are above the shoulders and the legs are parallel to the floor. (photos)
Master of Sport
The term used to refer to a gymnast competing at the highest level of the sport in the USSR. Still used in Russia and other former Soviet republics.
Mat
Safety equipment used in gymnastics to break falls.
Meet
A commonly used term for a gymnastics competition.
Middle
In acrobatic gymnastics, the role in group competition that requires a combination of strength, balance, flexibility and power.
Mount
The act of getting onto an apparatus and the skill used to do it.

Execution of the Manna

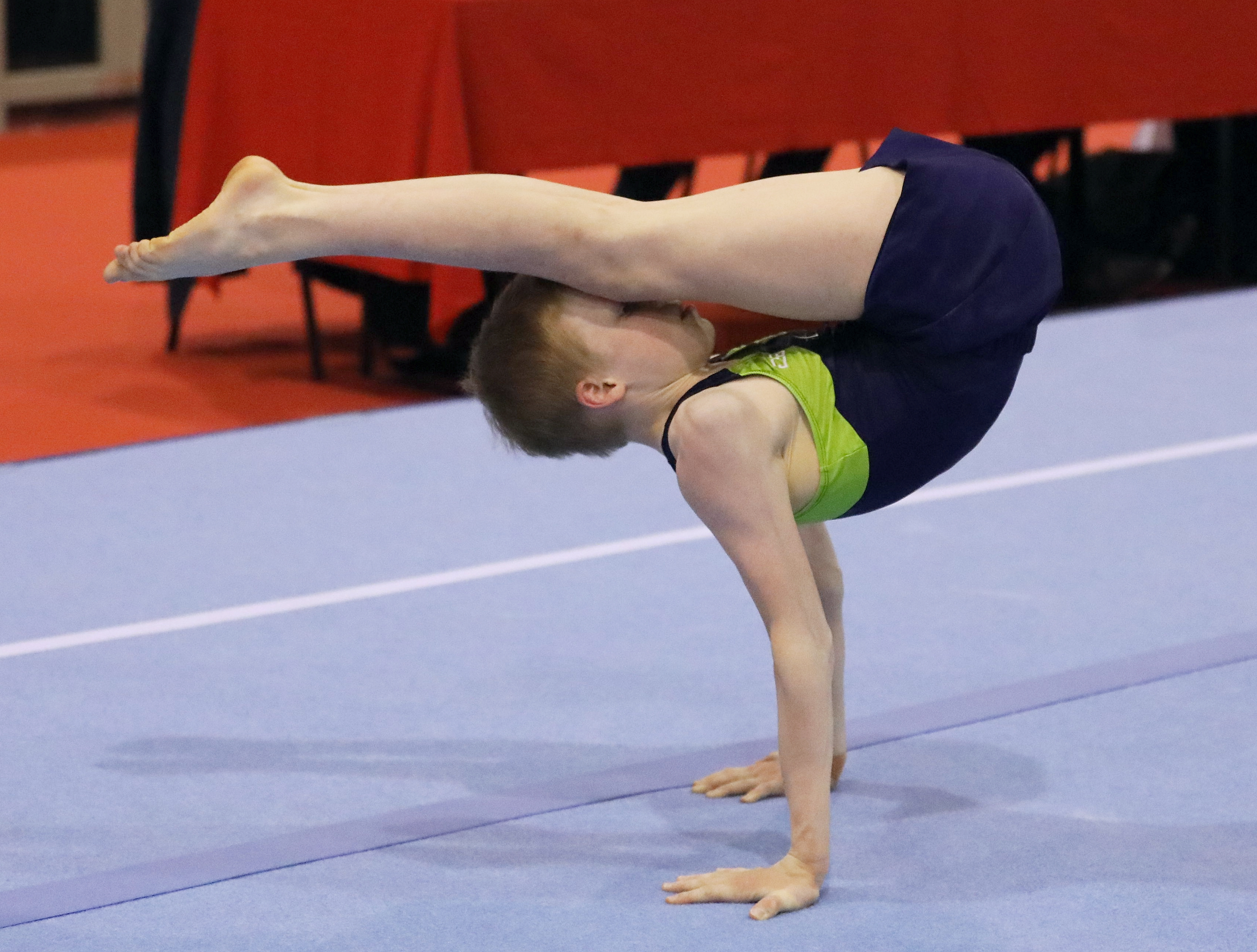
Manna performed by the artistic gymnast Max Krüger at the Swiss Junior Gymnastics Championships 2022 in Lugano, crosswise angle

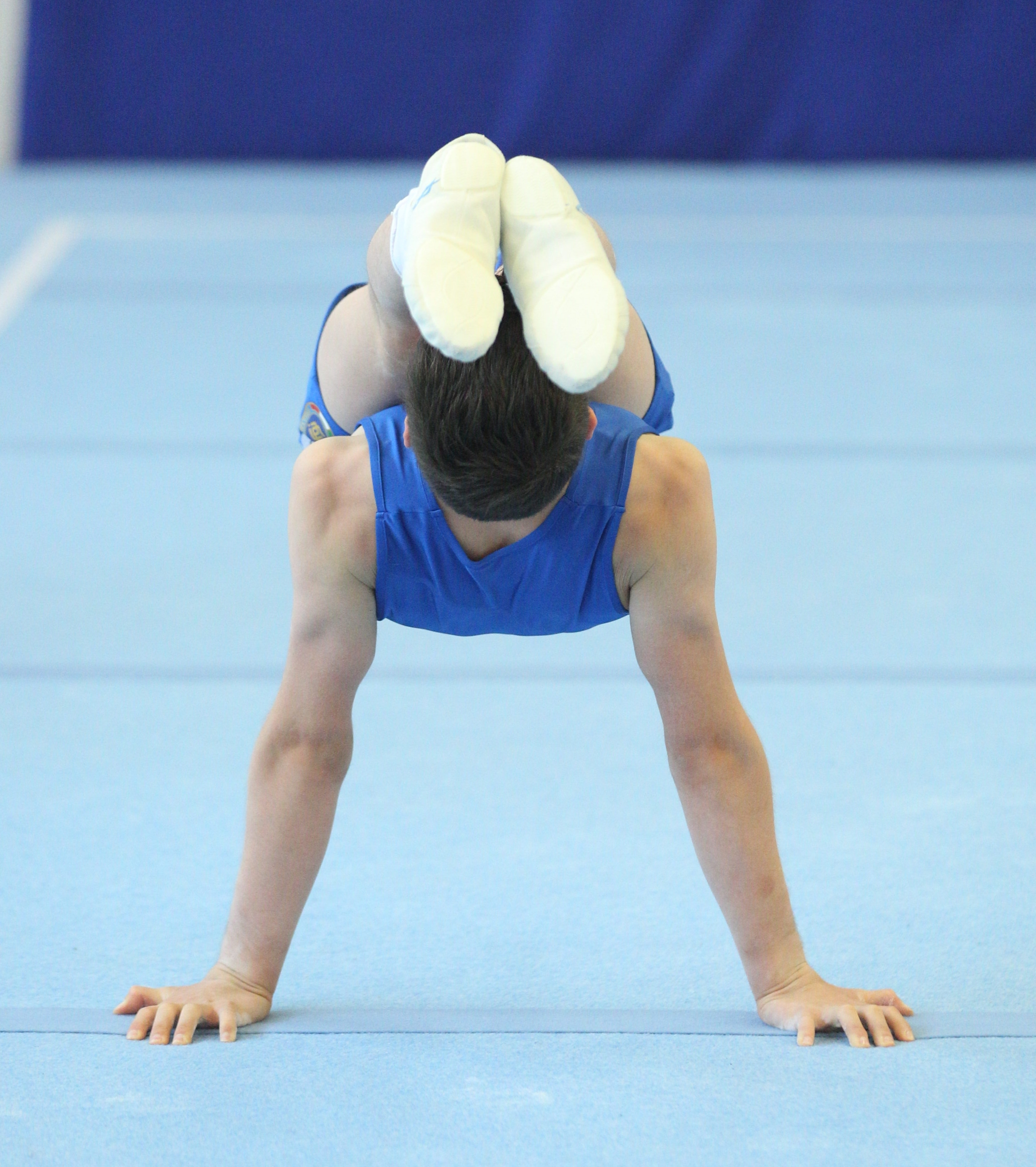
Manna performed by the artistic gymnast Achille Andrea Montrasio at the 5th International Junior Budapest Cup 2019, lengthwise angle

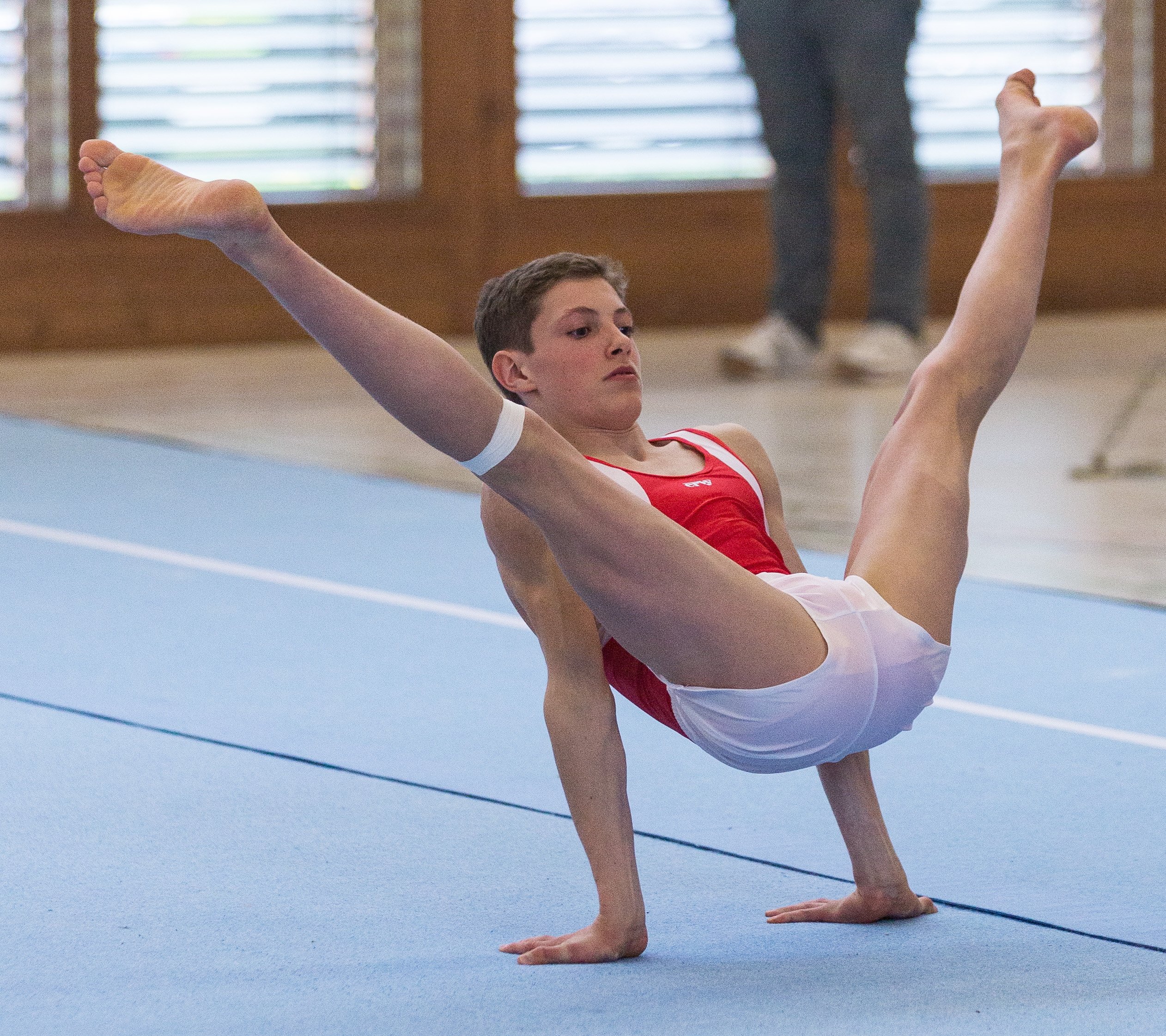
Straddle before Manna performed by the artistic gymnast Silas Dittmann at the 24th Rheintalcup 2019

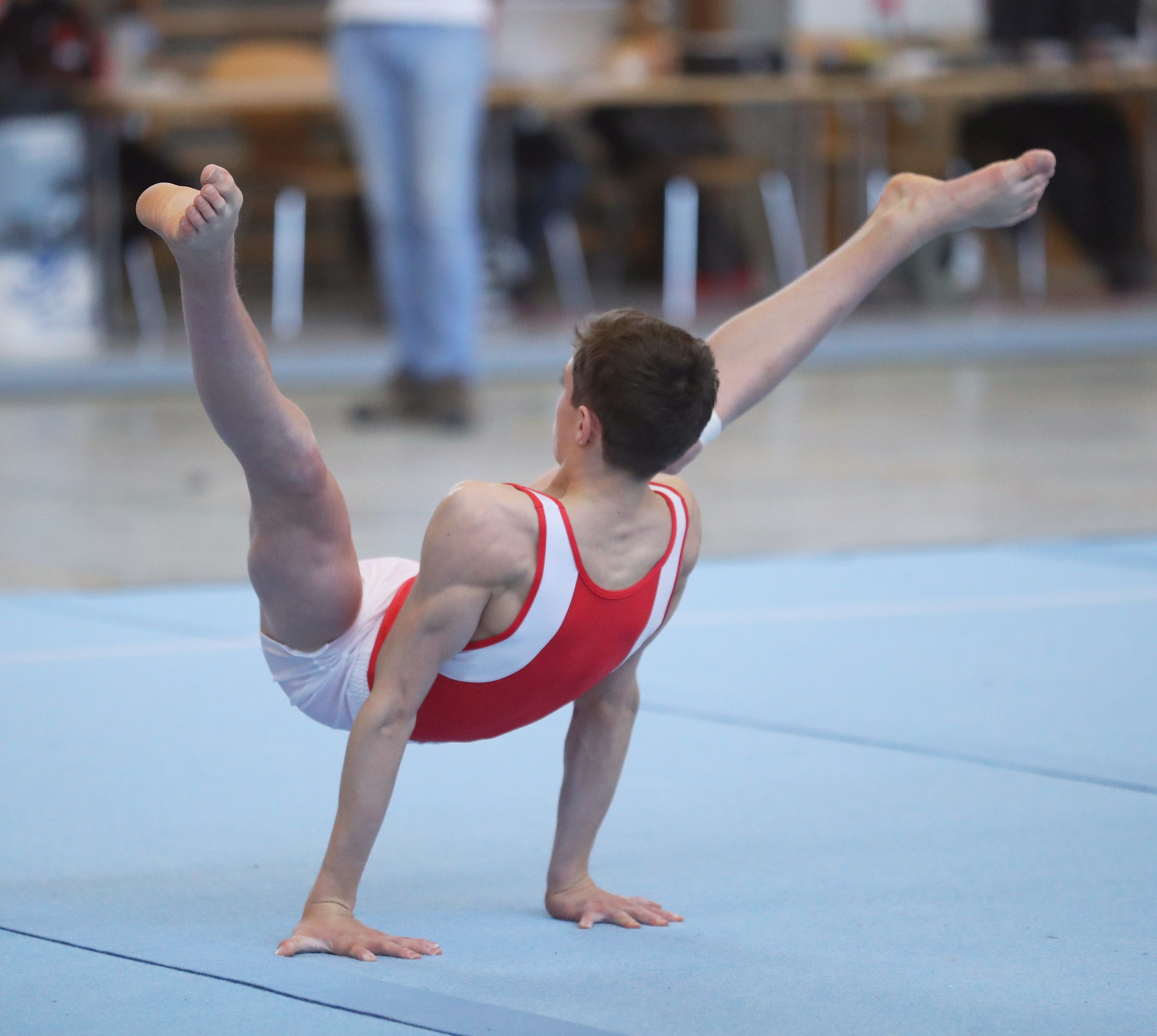
Different angle of the same straddle before Manna

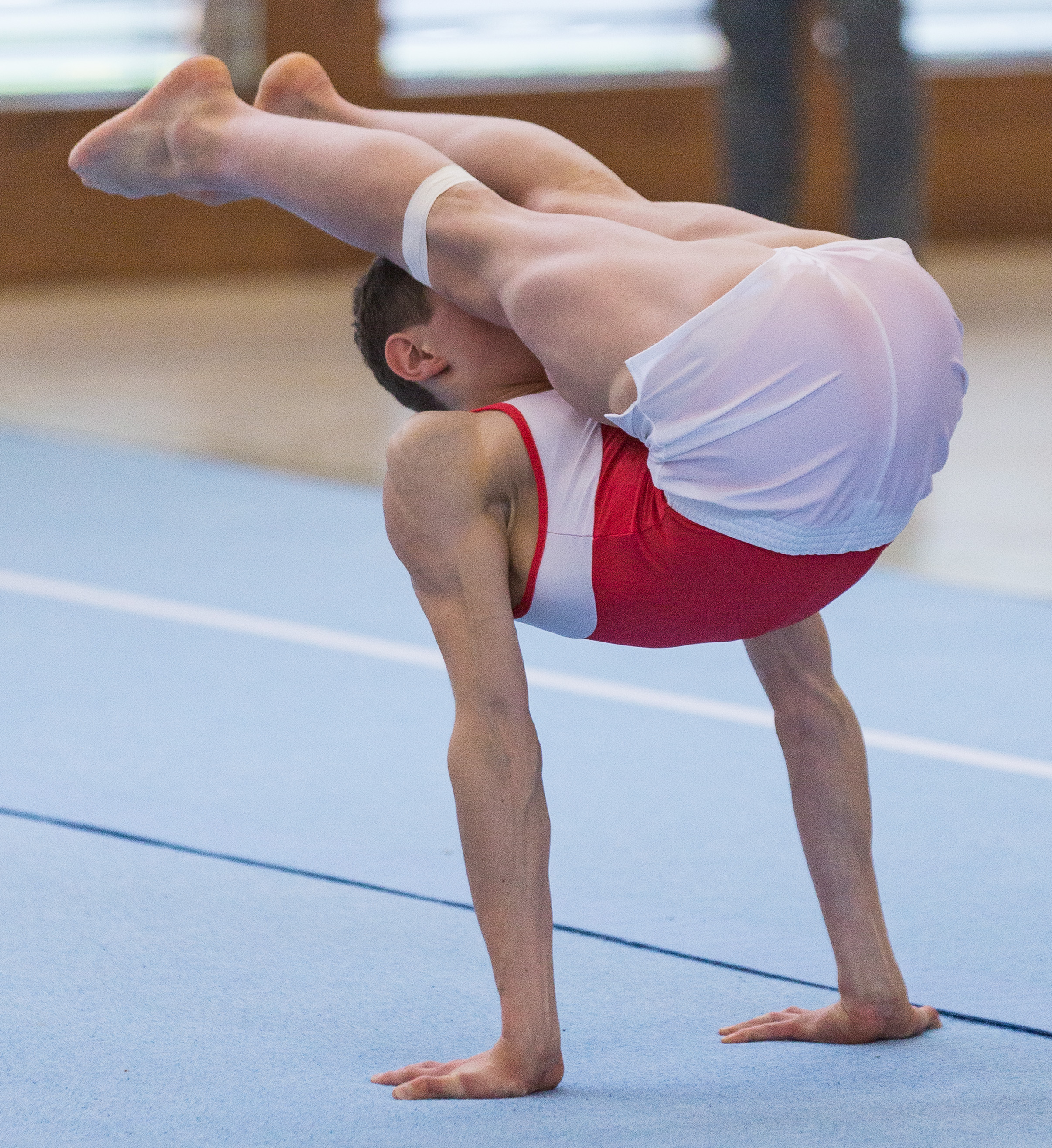
Manna performed by the artistic gymnast Silas Dittmann at the 24th Rheintalcup 2019

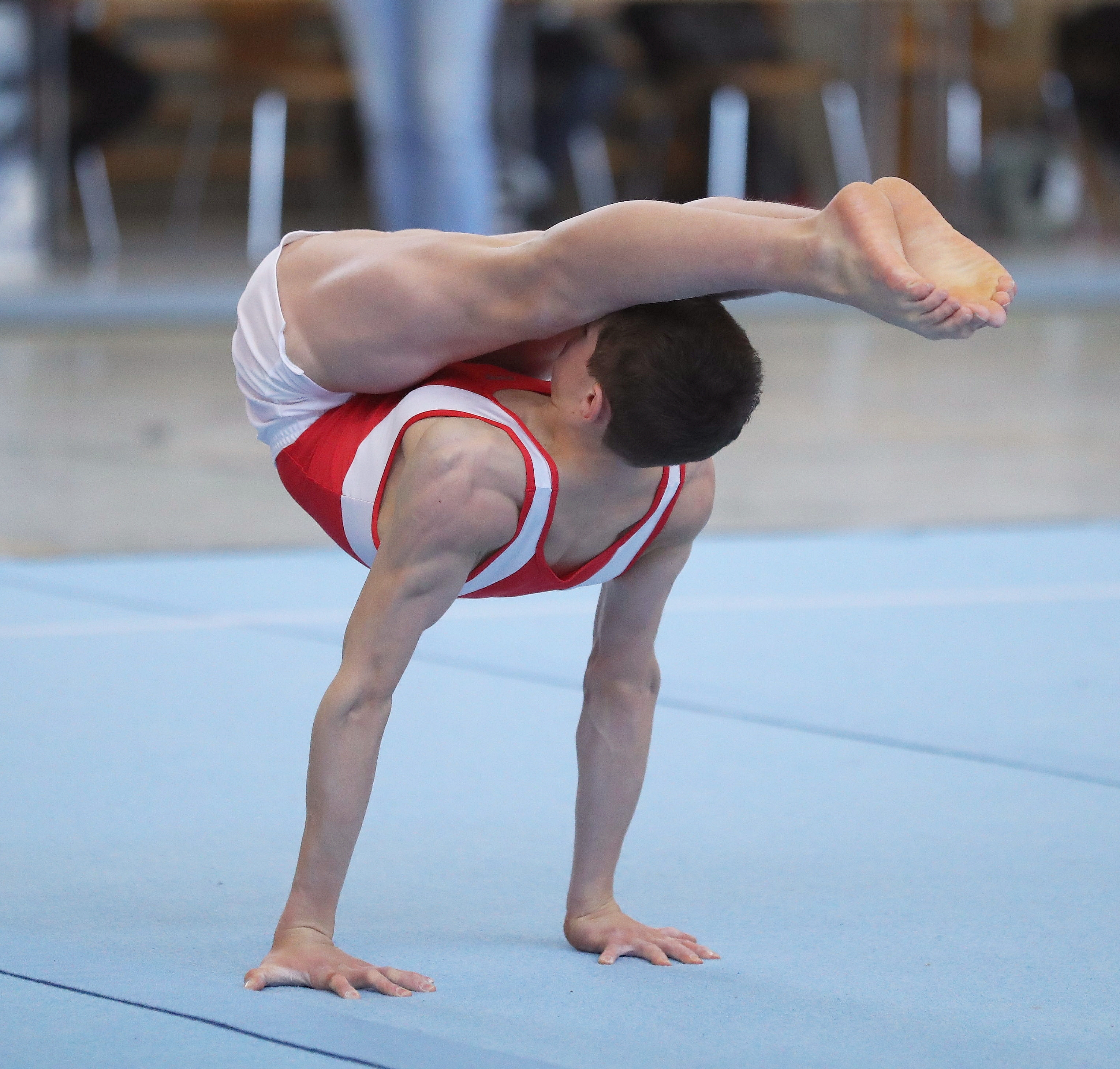
Different angle of the same Manna

== N ==
Neutral deduction
A score deduction which is taken as a penalty for violations of rules not related directly to the gymnasts' performance, for instance, failure to adhere to required standards of competition attire. Neutral deductions may be applied against a team's cumulative score as well as against individual gymnasts.
Number
See bib.
Needle
To put two hands on the floor and one leg on the floor, then kick the other leg into a full split.
No handed forward roll
Self explanatory.

== O ==
OOB
Abbreviation for out of bounds.
Out of bounds
Situation on floor exercise or vault when a gymnast crosses the line indicating the border of the mat, resulting in a score deduction.
Onodi
A backhandspring with a half turn mid air, in which a gymnast finishes with a front walkover.
One-handed cartwheel
A regular cartwheel is performed, but one hand is placed and kept behind the back.

== P ==
Parallel bars
A gymnastics apparatus used by men in artistic gymnastics. It consists of two 3.5m bars.
PB
The scoring abbreviation for the parallel bars.
PH
The scoring abbreviation for the pommel horse.
Pike
A position where the body is bent only in the hips.
Pommel horse
A gymnastics apparatus used by men in artistic gymnastics. It consists of a rectangular body and two pommels.
Posture
Movement of the body
Pullover
A move on bars in which the gymnast starts off the bar, then uses their arm strength to pull themself up and over the bar.
Press hand stand
The gymnasts starts on the floor in a straddle, then pushes all their body weight onto their hands and presses into a handstand.

== Q ==
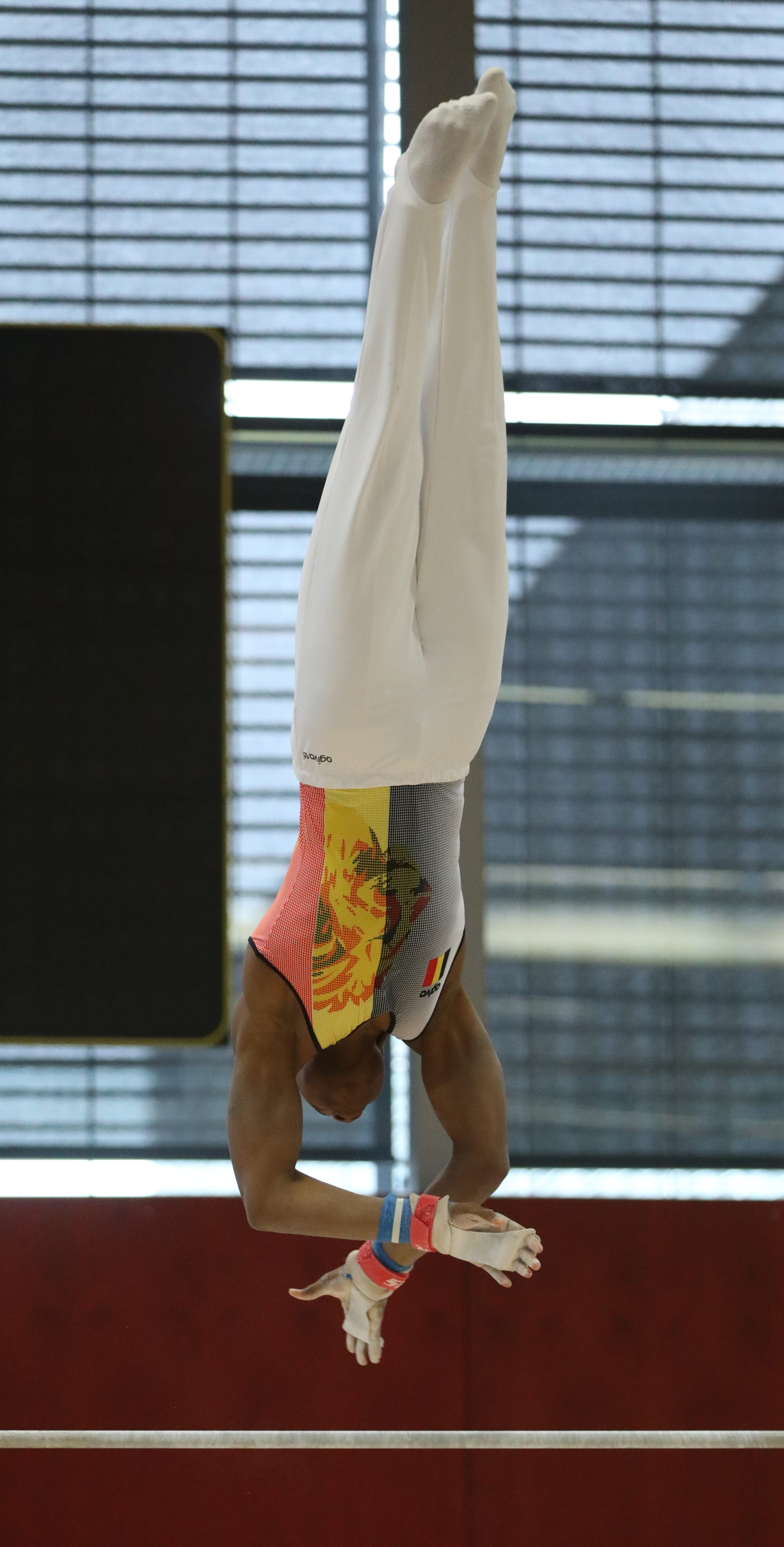
A Belgian gymnast performs a quast over horizontal bar at Luxembourg Open 2023

Quast
The gymnast performs a flying giant swing backwards with a full twist over horizontal bar. Named after East German gymnast Ralf Quast.

== R ==
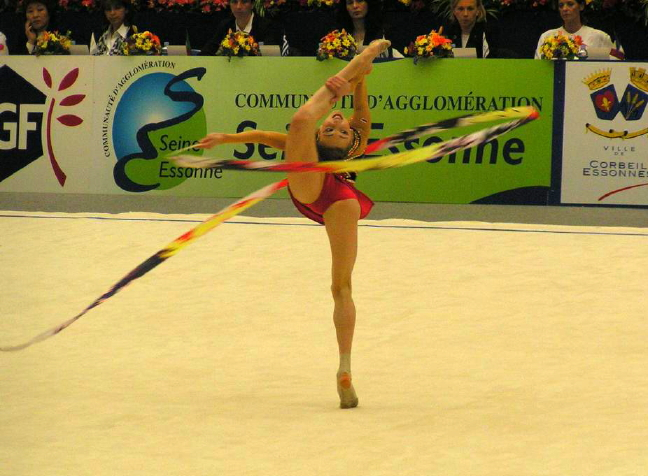
Elizabeth Paisieva, a rhythmic gymnast, performing with a ribbon

Release move or release
Skill on the uneven bars, parallel bars or high bar in which the gymnast lets go of the apparatus, performs a skill in the air, and regrasps the bar.
Ribbon
A gymnastics apparatus used in rhythmic gymnastics. The ribbon is a long piece of material attached to a stick.
Rings
See still rings.
Roundoff
A move similar to a cartwheel where the gymnast pushes off the ground and lands on two feet, facing the direction in which the move was initiated in. This move is often used to initiate a tumble.
Roll
A roll is a rotation over an axis in the body over a surface.
Rope
A gymnastics apparatus used in rhythmic gymnastics. It is made of a material that retains the qualities of lightness and suppleness. It is knotted at the end.
Rhythmic gymnastics
A discipline of gymnastics in which competitors manipulate apparatuses. The sport combines elements of ballet, gymnastics, theatrical dance, and apparatus manipulation. Athletes are scored on their leaps, balances, pivots, flexibility, apparatus handling, and artistic effect.

== S ==
Salto
A somersault.
Score protest
A written complaint, submitted by the gymnast or their coaches or federation, to request reconsideration and possible revision of scores felt to be incorrect or unfair. Under FIG rules, protests must be filed immediately after the original score is reported, and before the end of the competition.
Senior
A world-class/elite gymnast who is at least 16, or will be turning 16, within the calendar year.
Somersault
A gymnastics maneuver in which a person rotates around the somersault axis, moving the feet over the head.
Specialist
A gymnast who is especially strong on one or two events. A specialist often competes only on their specific events.
Springboard
Gymnastics equipment required on vault, and used as an optional aid for mounts on parallel bars, balance beam and uneven bars.
SR
The scoring abbreviation for the still rings.
Start value
Under the pre-2006 Code of Points, the maximum score a gymnast could receive for a routine, after taking into consideration all bonus skills, combinations and fulfillment of required elements. The score was determined by subtracting deductions from the start value.
Stick
To land an acrobatic skill, jump, or dismount perfectly, without any steps, stumbles or errors.
Still rings
A gymnastics apparatus used by men in artistic gymnastics. It consists of two swinging hollow rings suspended by a frame.

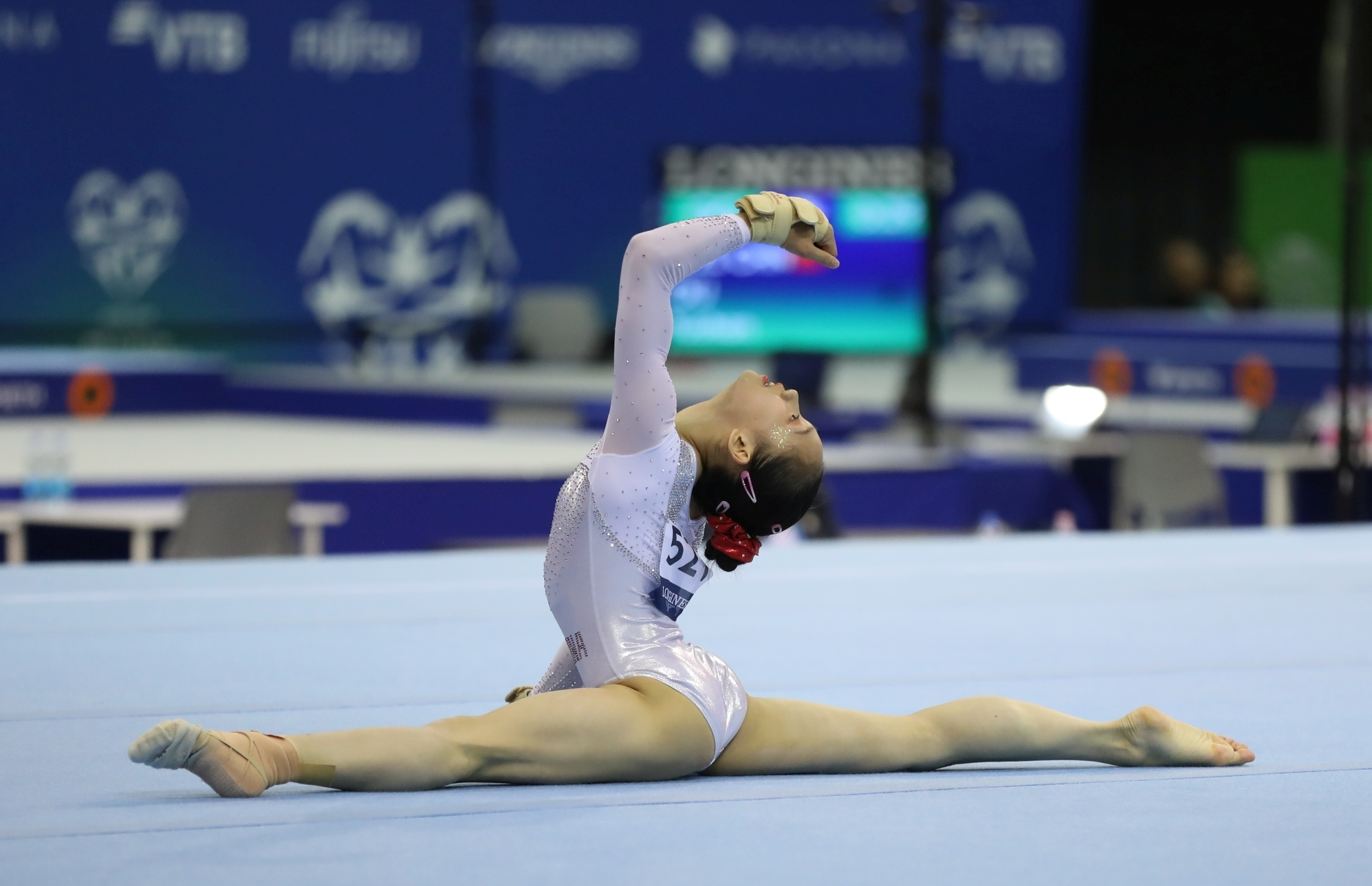
Splits performed by Ou Yushan

Straddle
A sitting position with the legs wide. It can also be performed at height.
Stuck landing
A perfect landing, without any steps, stumbles or errors.
SV
Abbreviation for start value.
Splits
A move in which the gymnast goes to the ground with one leg in front of them and one behind.

== T ==
Tap swing

A swing on uneven bars or horizontal bar that uses changing body position to generate speed and power for skills such as release moves and dismounts. The gymnast's body is in a hollow position at the rear of the swing, arched during the descent to vertical, and whipped back to a hollow position to accelerate the swing upwards.

Team final, or TF
A team of six gymnasts (or five gymnasts at the 2012 London Olympics) representing a country for the team competition.
Tkatchev
Swing forward and vault backward piked to hang. Named after Aleksandr Tkachyov.
Toe shoes
Shoes commonly worn by rhythmic gymnasts to perform turns. They resemble a ballet shoe that only covers the toes. They may also be worn on one foot by artistic gymnasts on the balance beam or floor exercise to aid turns.
Top
In acrobatic gymnastics, the role in pair and group competition that emphasizes flexibility and agility. The top is usually a younger, smaller athlete.
Tsukahara
A vault and family of vaults. The vault consists of a half turn off the springboard onto the vault table, then a push backwards, usually into a back salto or layout. Any vault that has a handspring with ¼ – ½ turn onto the vault table into a salto backwards is classified as a Tsukahara vault. It is named after Mitsuo Tsukahara.
Tumbling
The acrobatic skills performed on floor exercise and balance beam, such as back handsprings and saltos. Also, a specific discipline of gymnastics, performed on a 25-meter-long dynamic track, in which participants perform tumbling skills.
Tumbling run, or tumbling pass
A series of acrobatic skills performed on floor from one corner of the mat to the other, typically beginning with a run and hurtle and ending with a major salto.
Tuck
A jump with knees to chest.
Twist
A layout with axial body rotation in addition to the fundamental rotation about the waist.

Execution of Tkatchev stretched

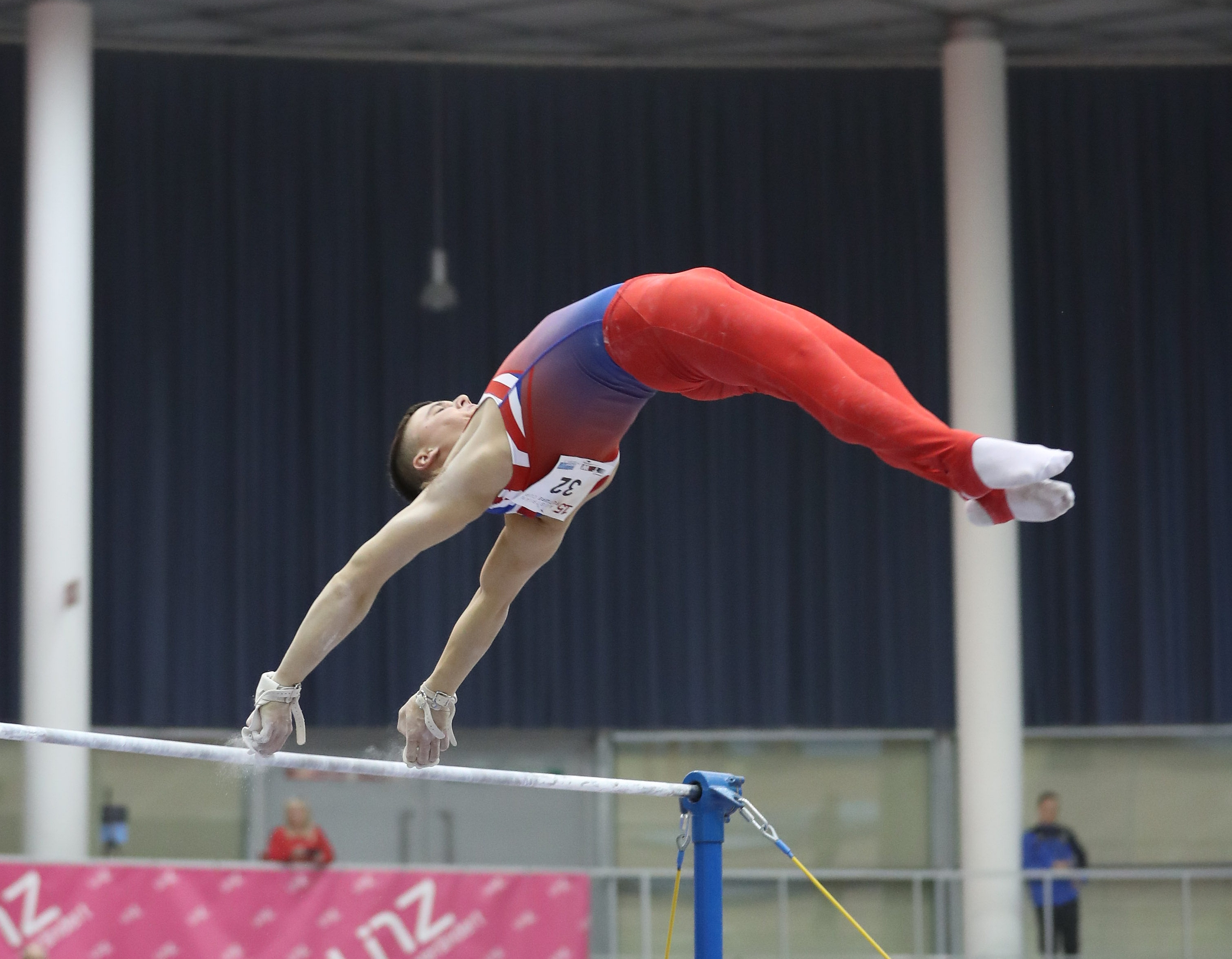
Performed by Matthew Boardman at the Austrian Future Cup 2018

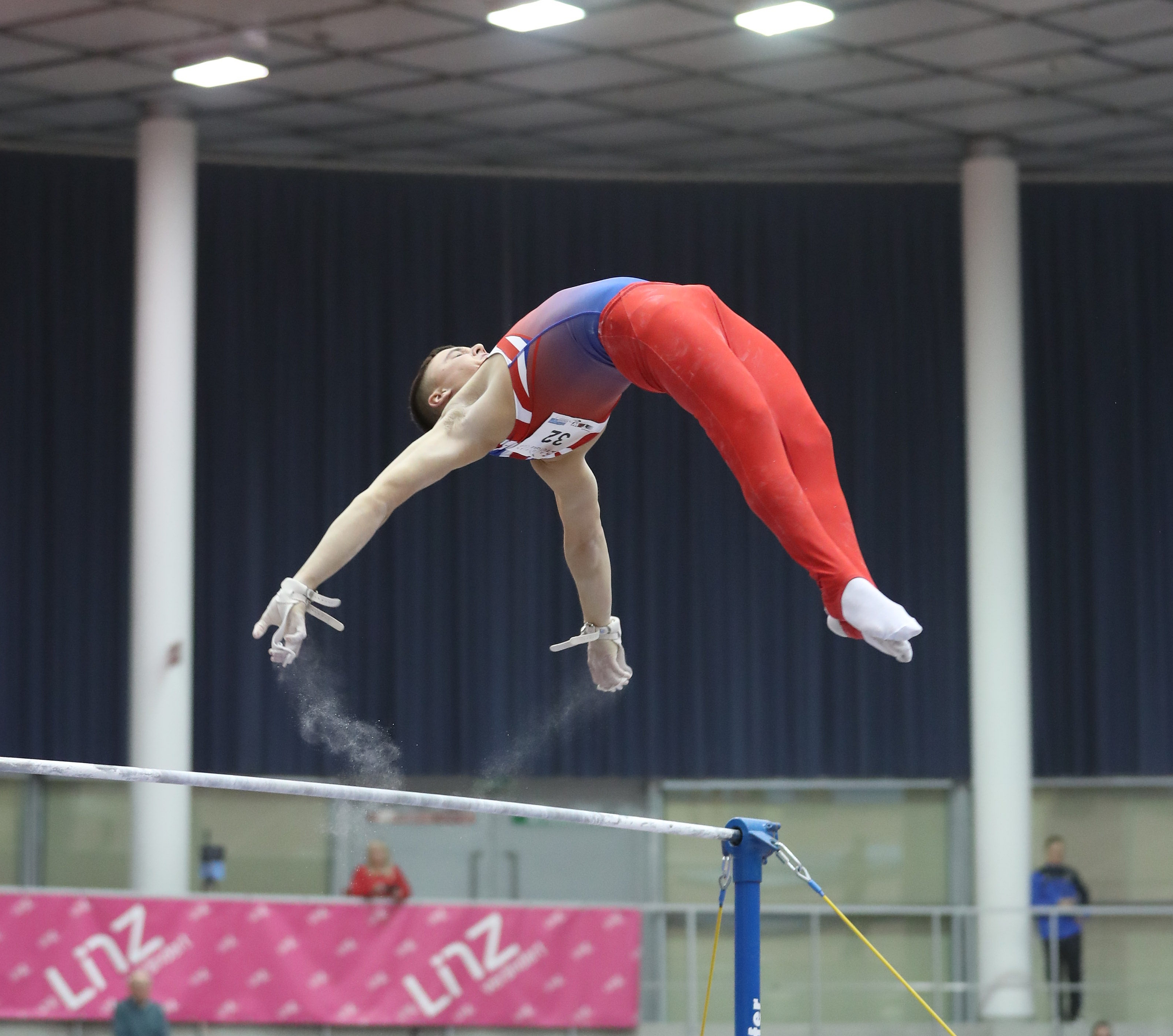

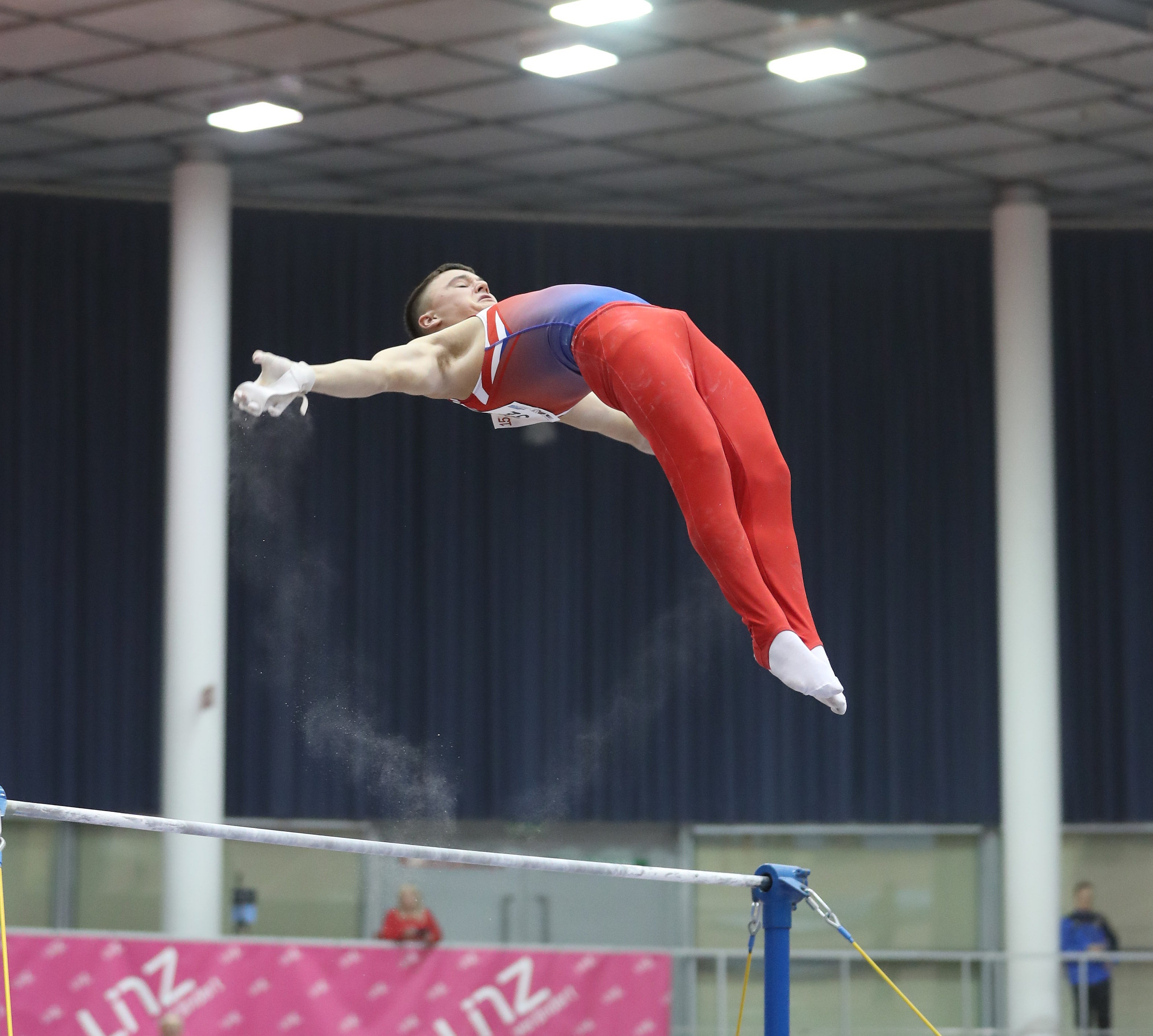

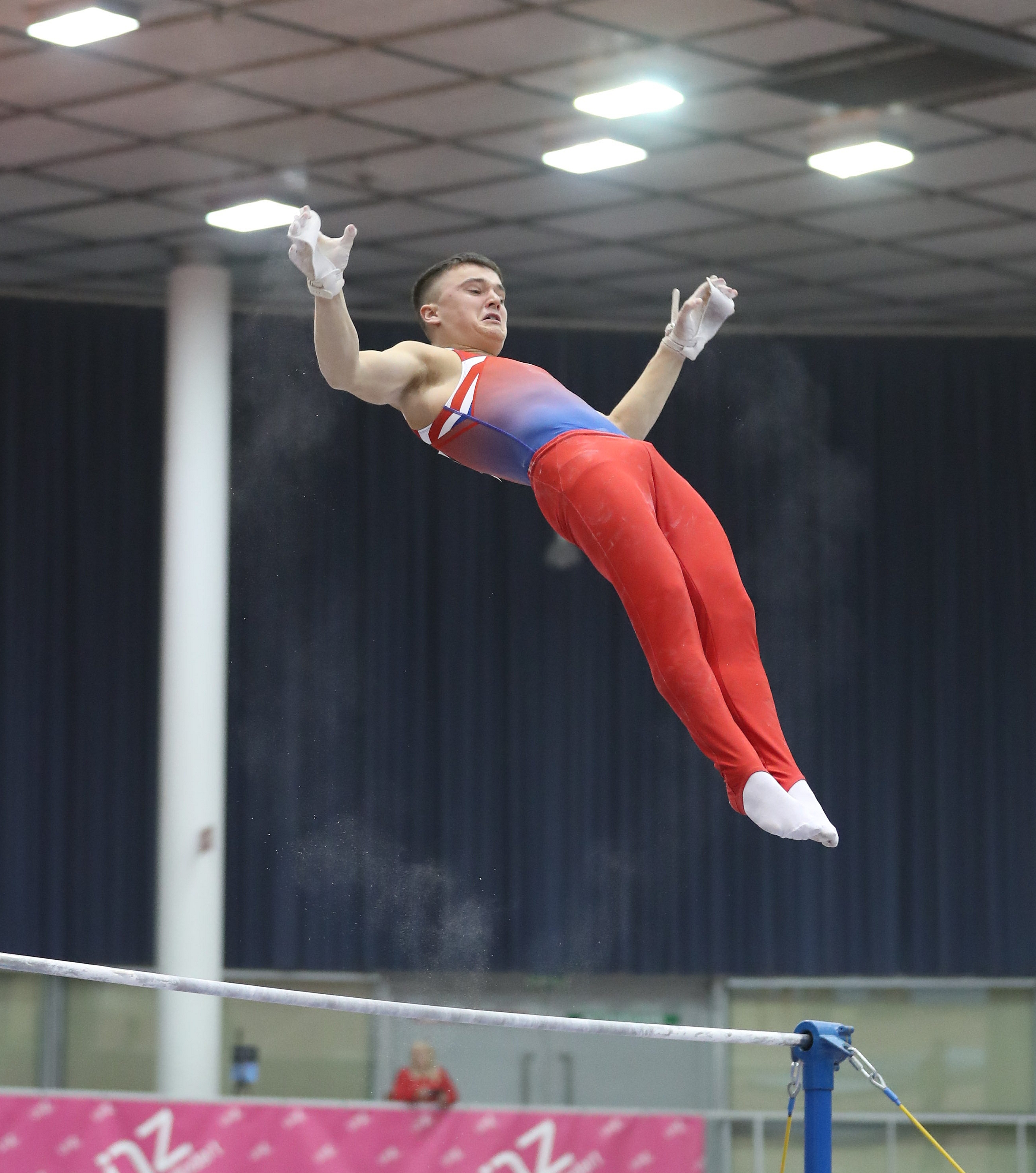

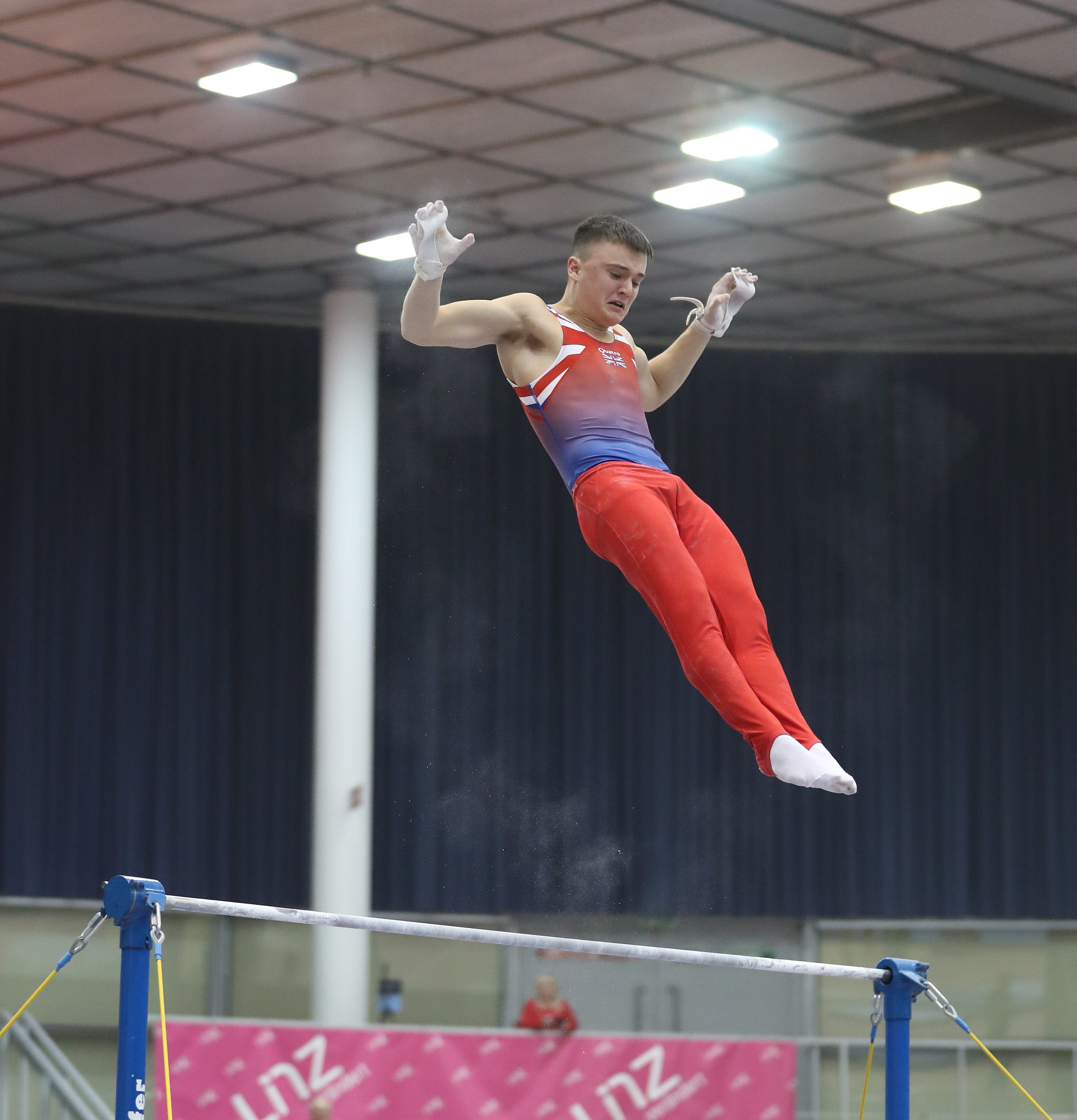

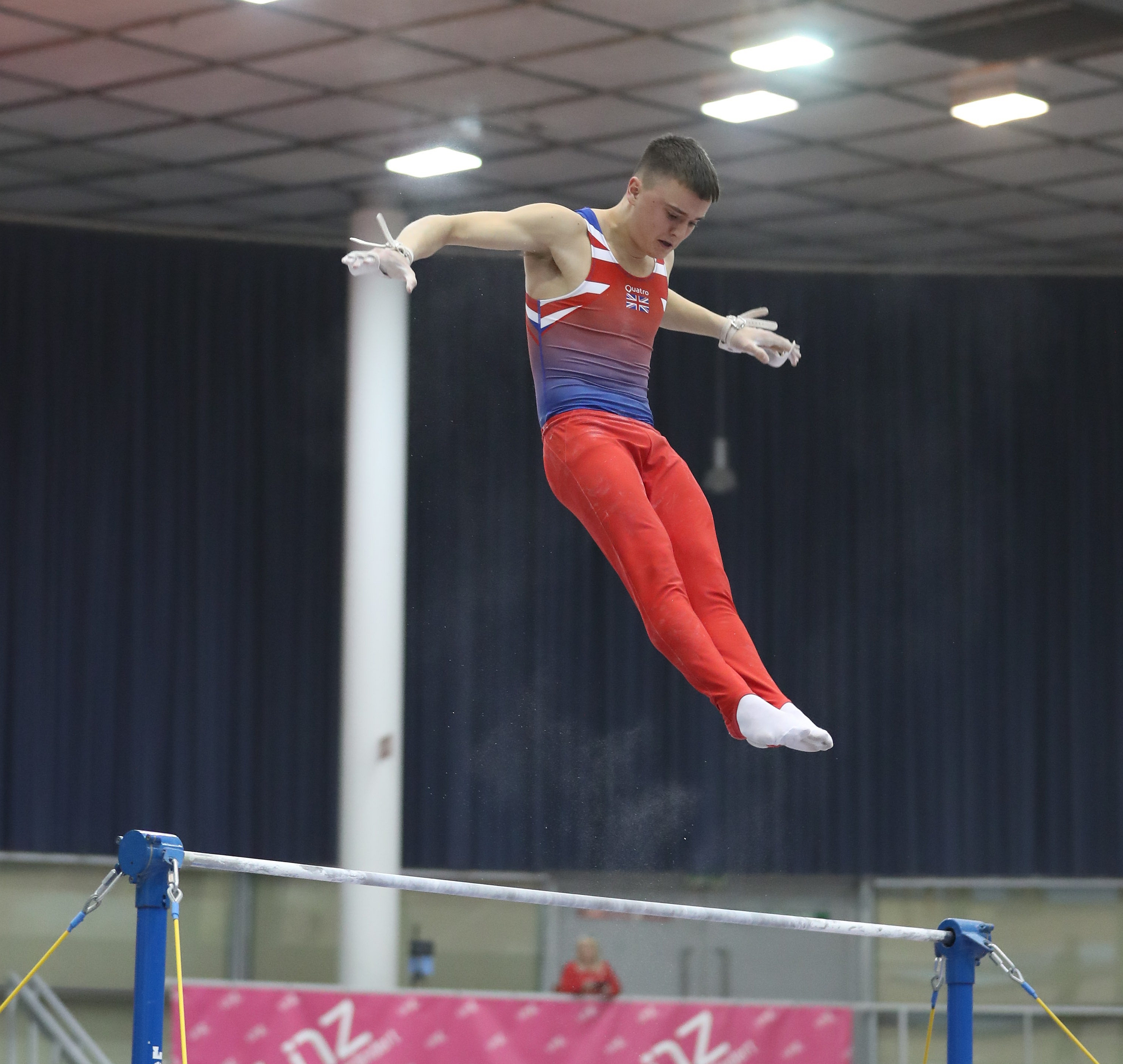

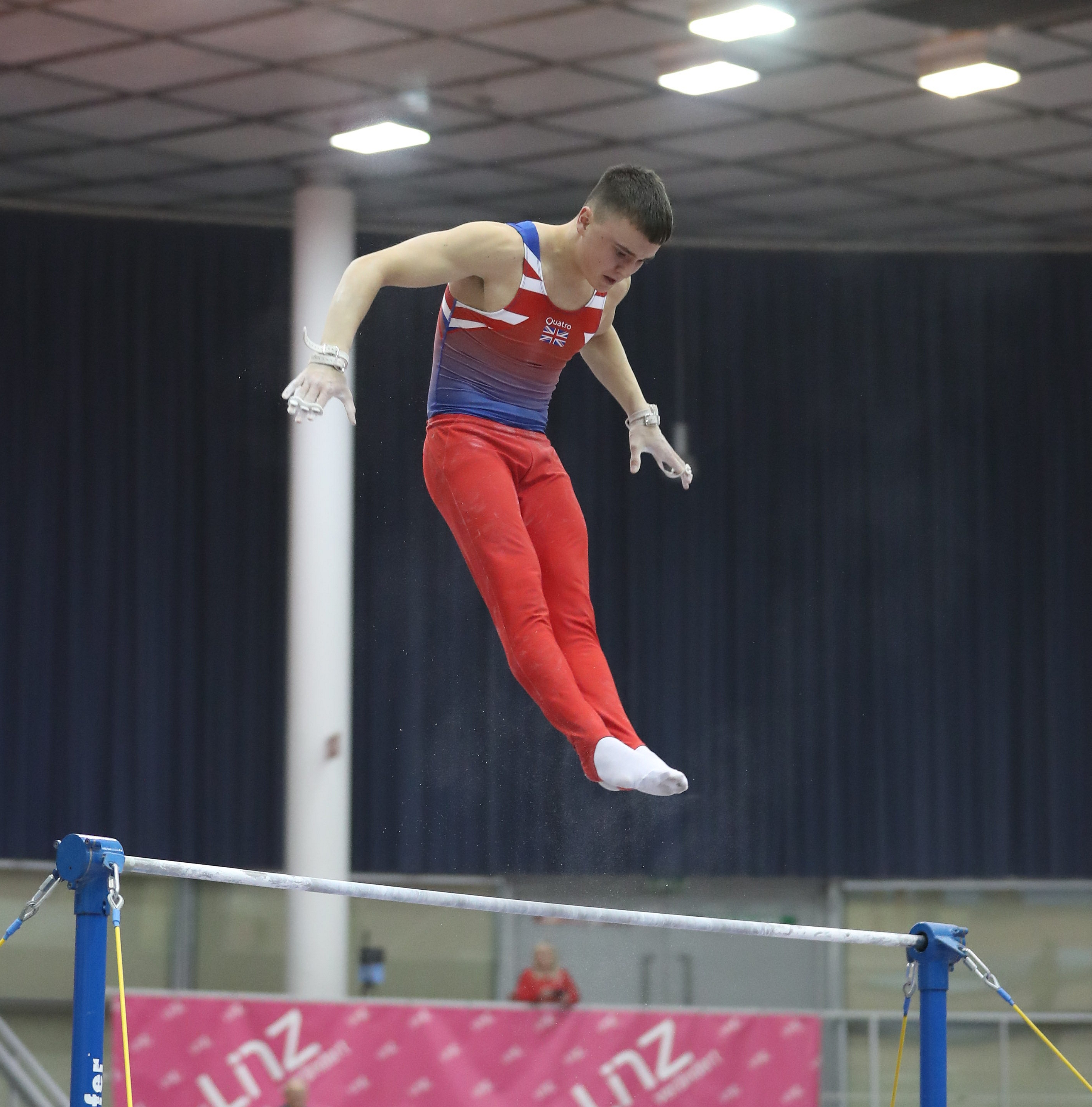

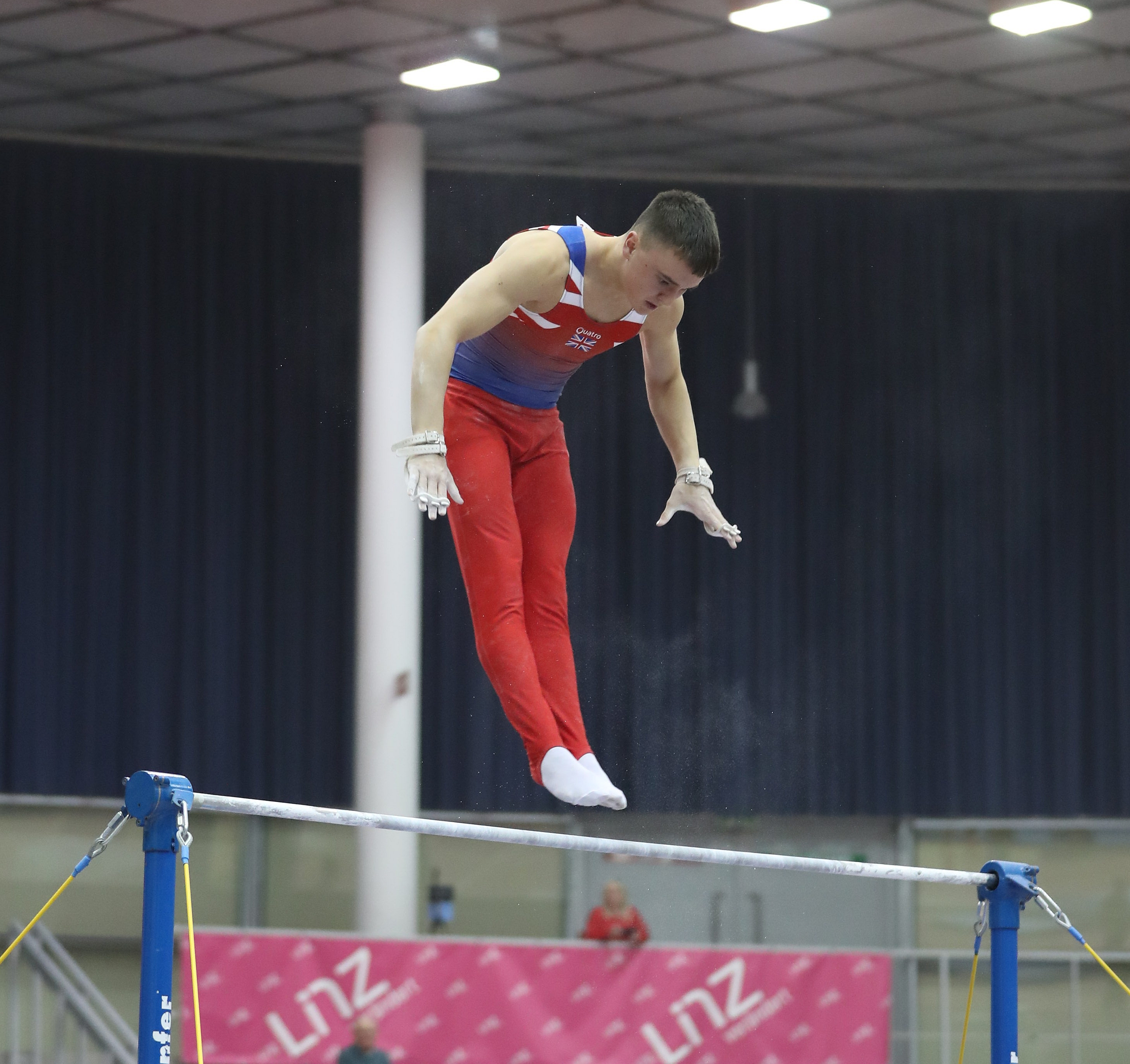

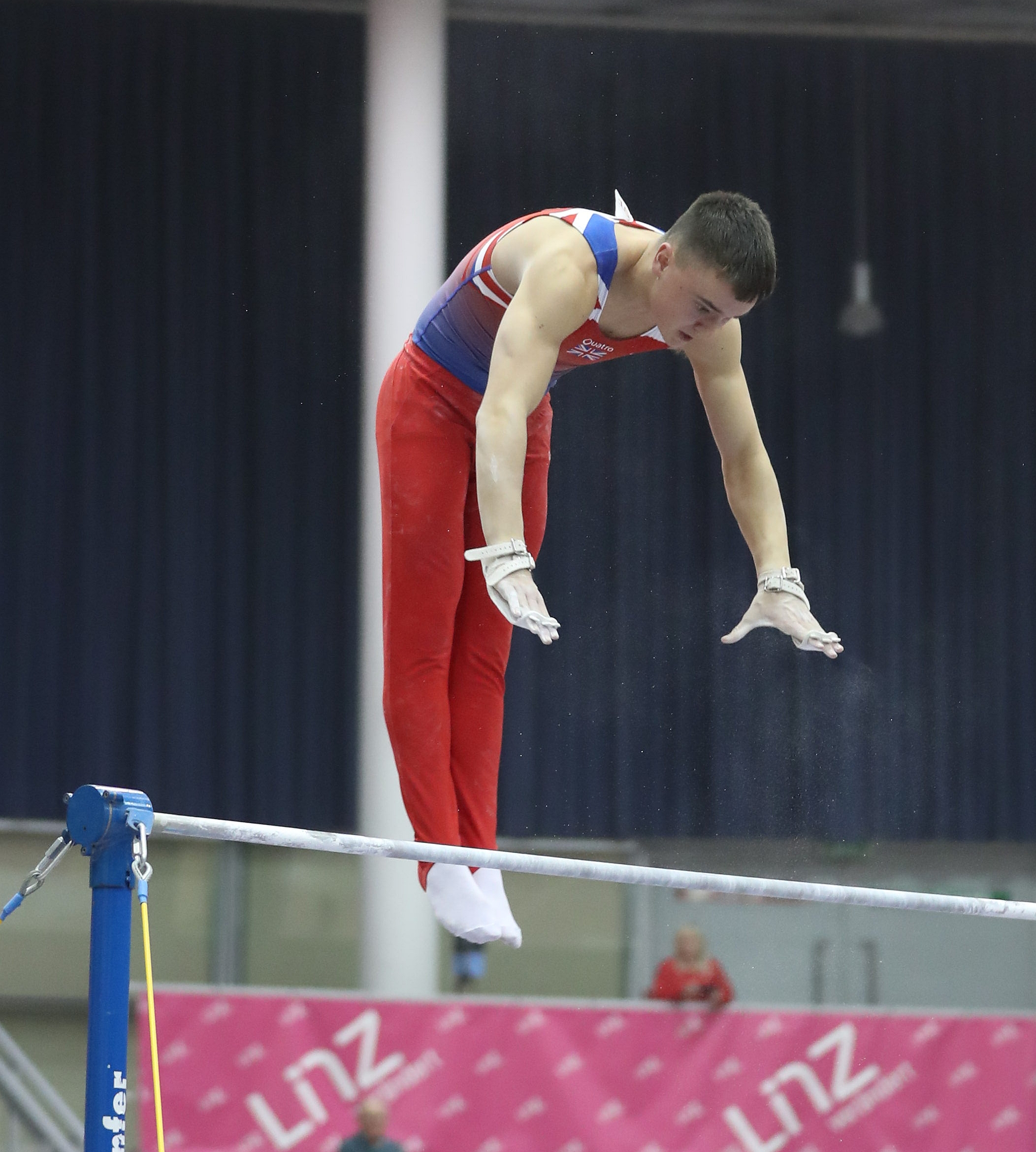

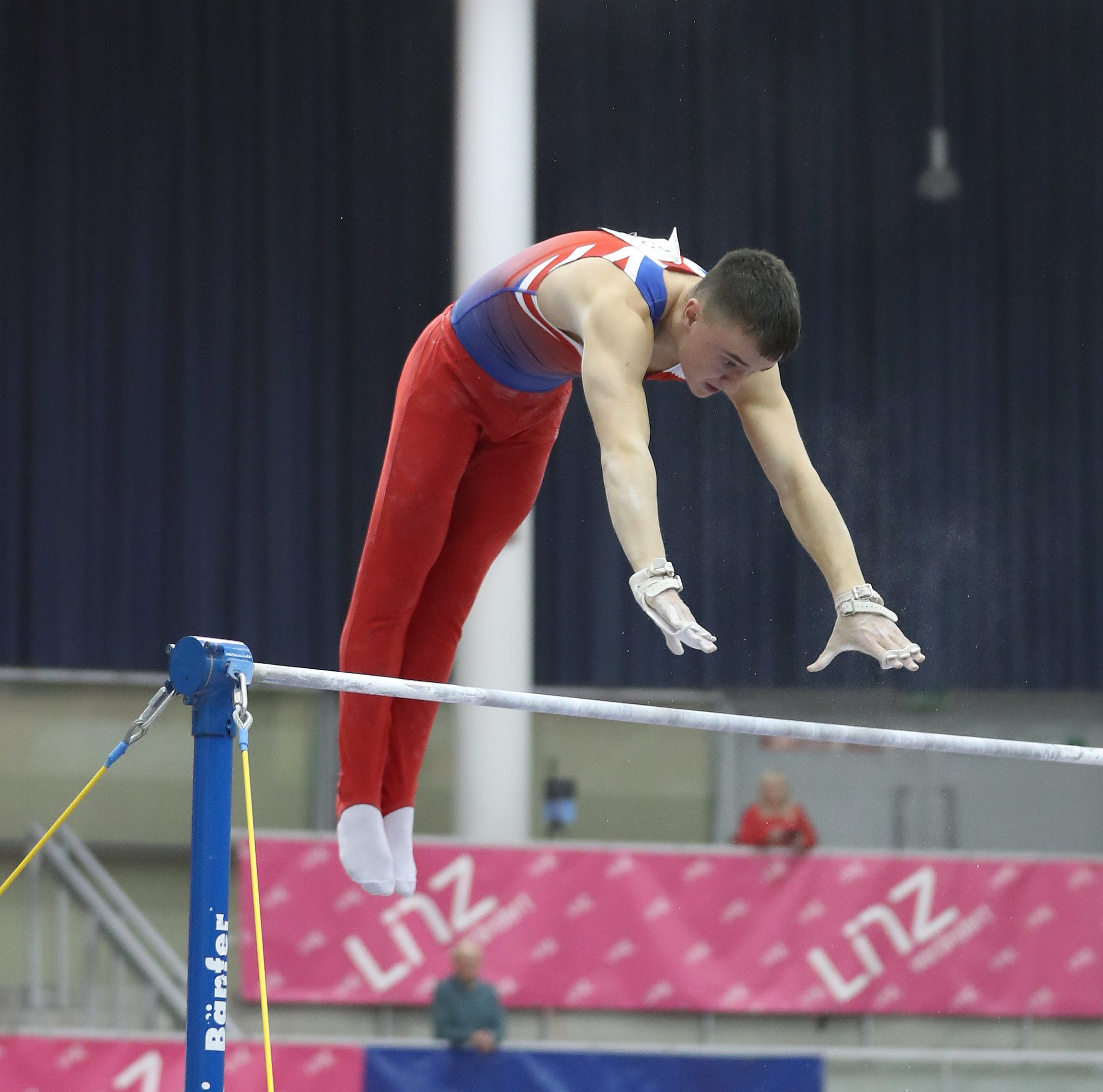

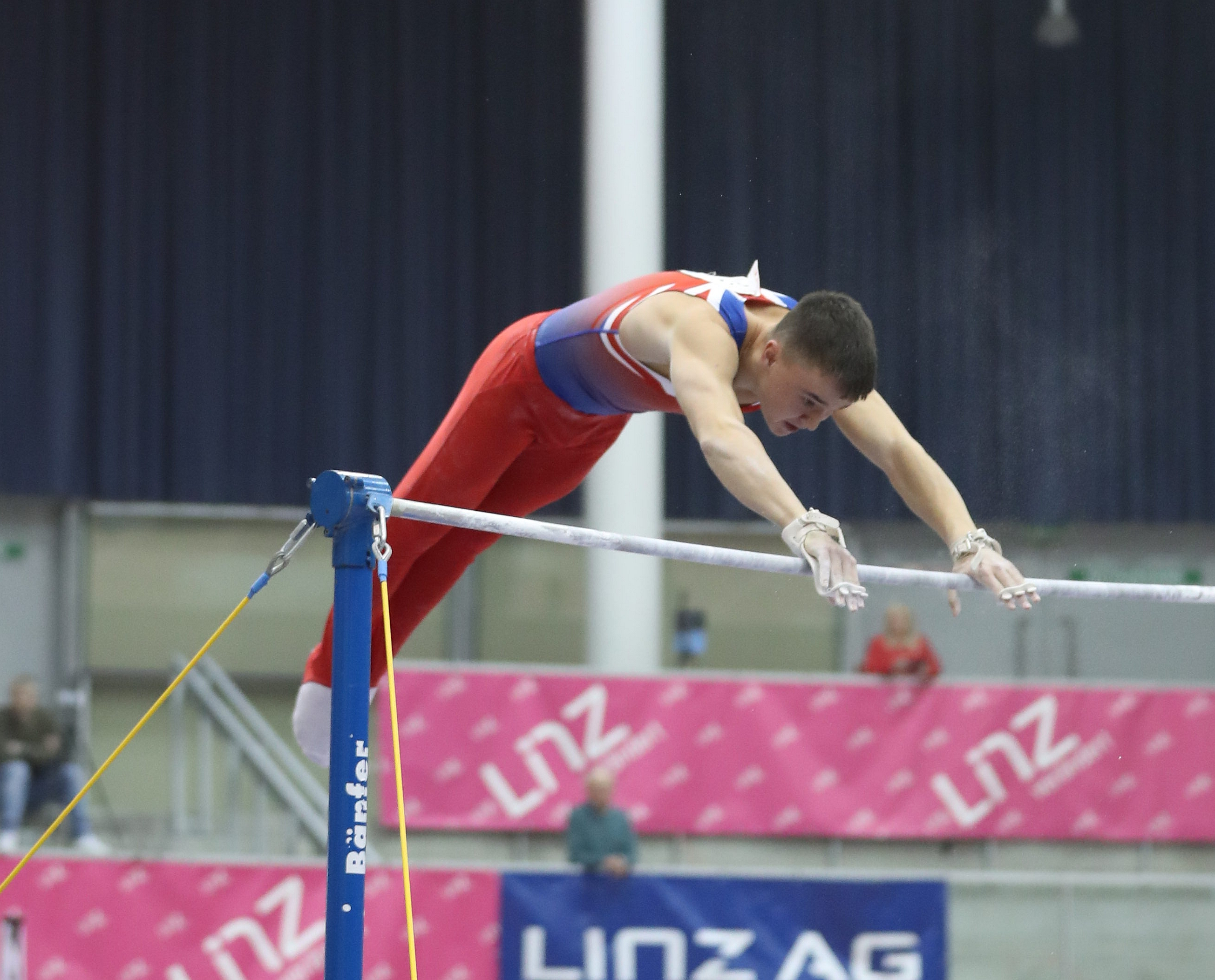

== V ==
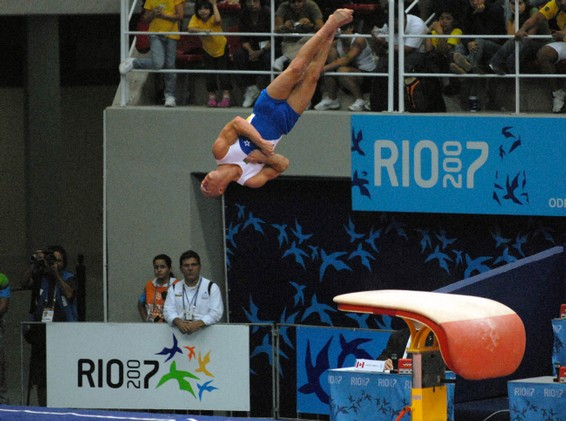
Diego Hypólito rotates in the air after the vaulting table.

Vault
A gymnastics apparatus used by both men and women in artistic gymnastics, or the skills performed upon it.
Voronin
Back uprise and piked vault with 1/2 (180°) turn to hang. Named after Mikhail Voronin.
VT
The scoring abbreviation for "vault".

Execution of the Voronin

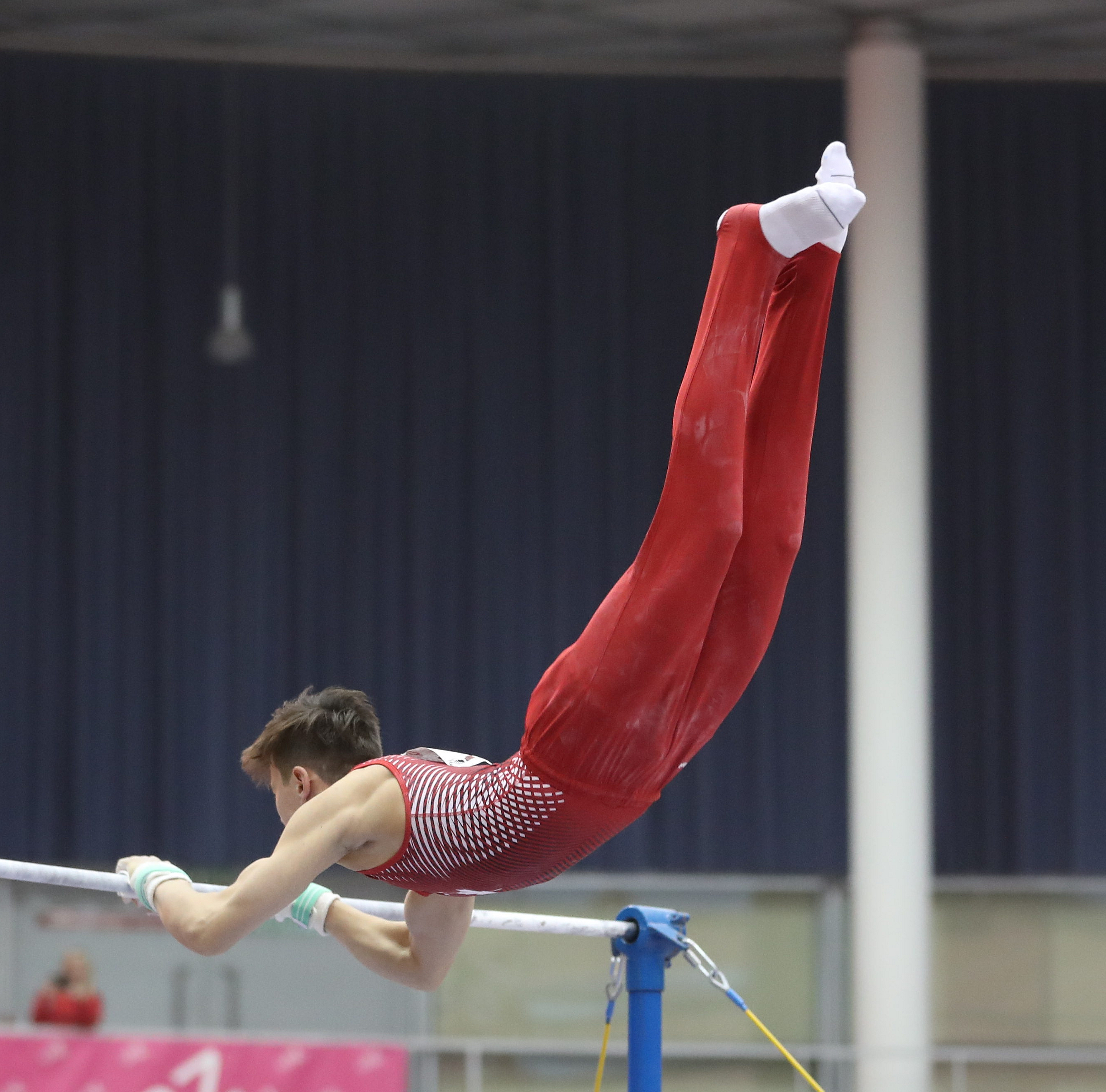
Performed by Evgeny Siminiuc at the Austrian Future Cup 2018

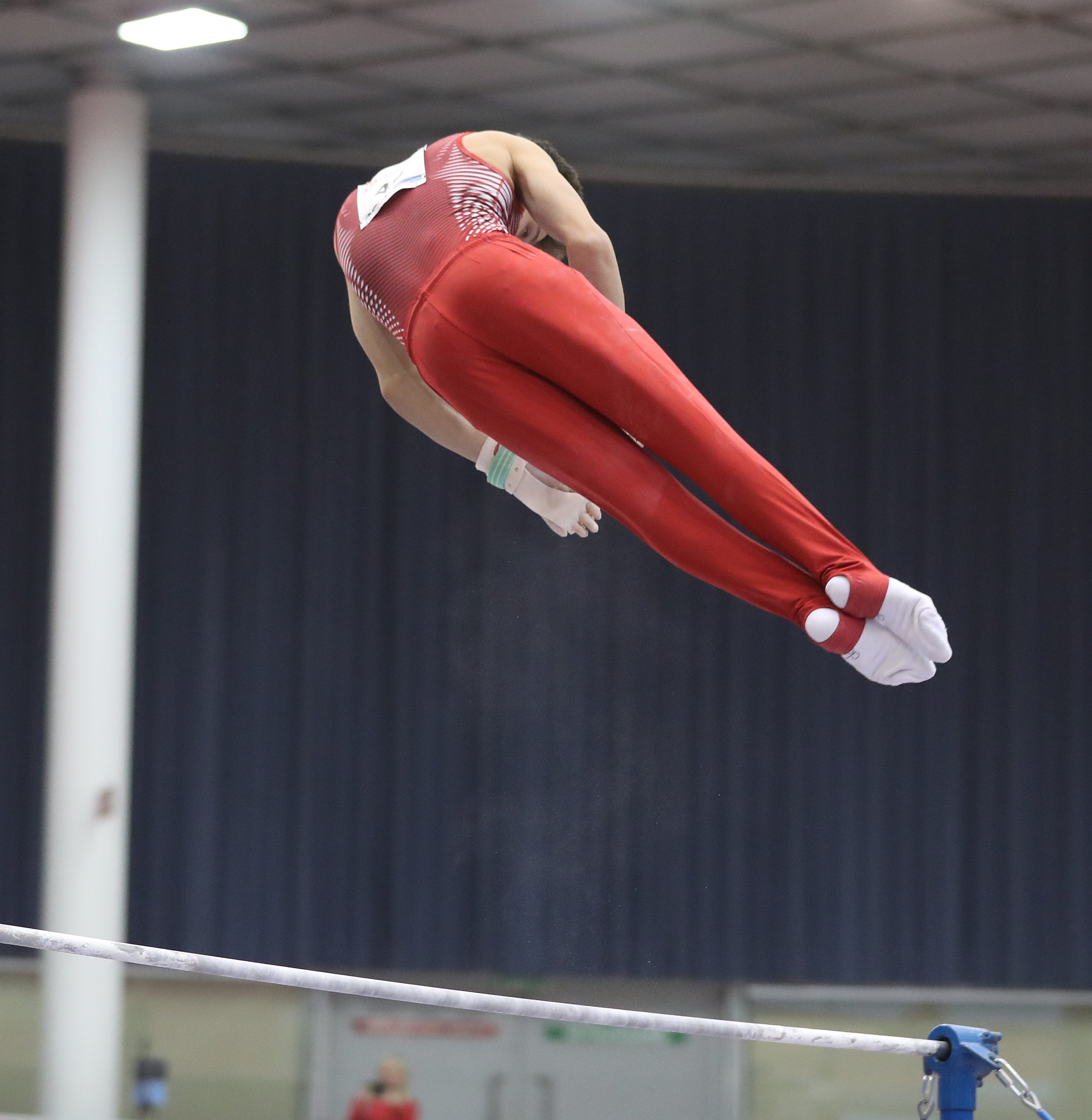

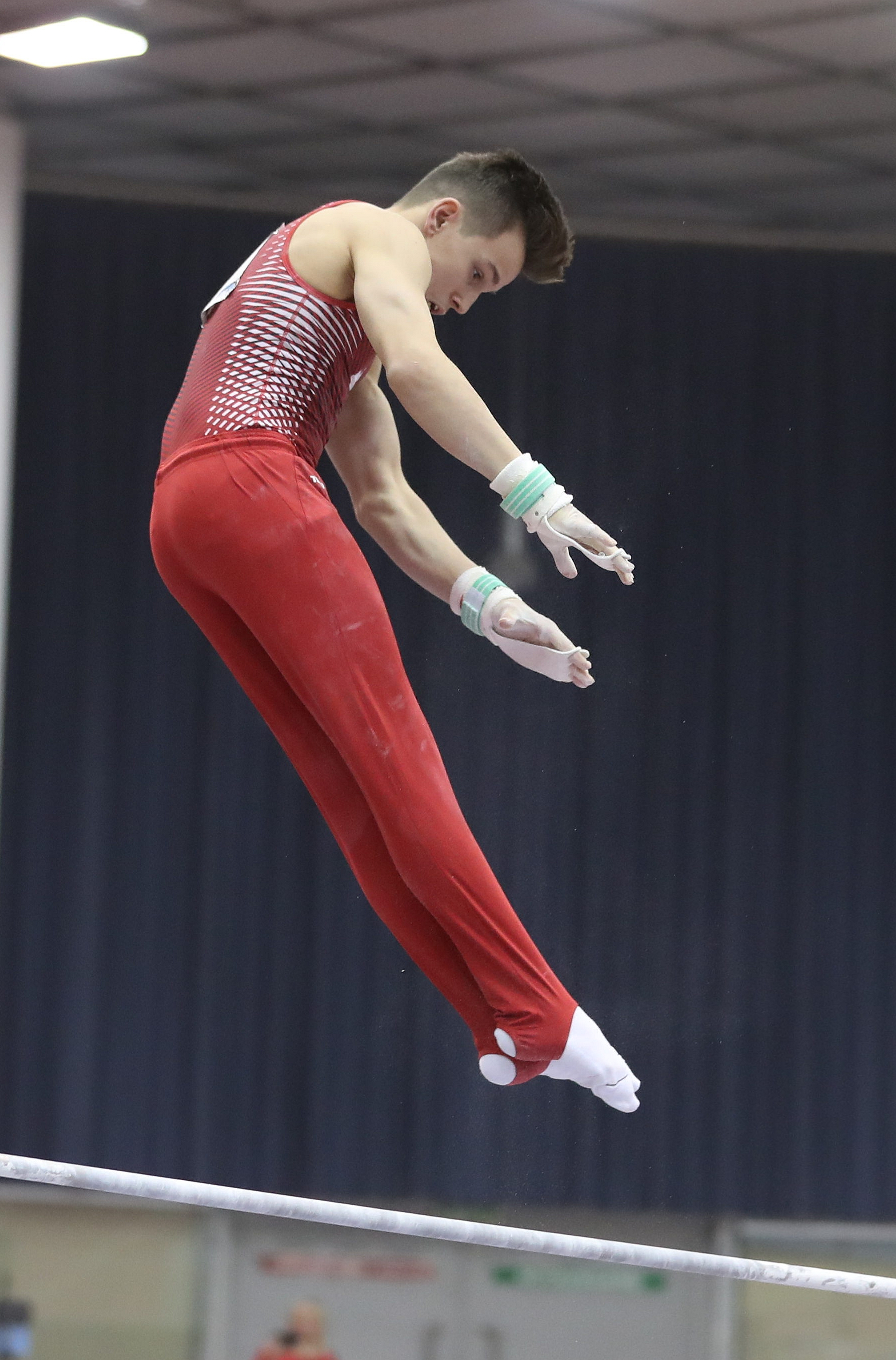

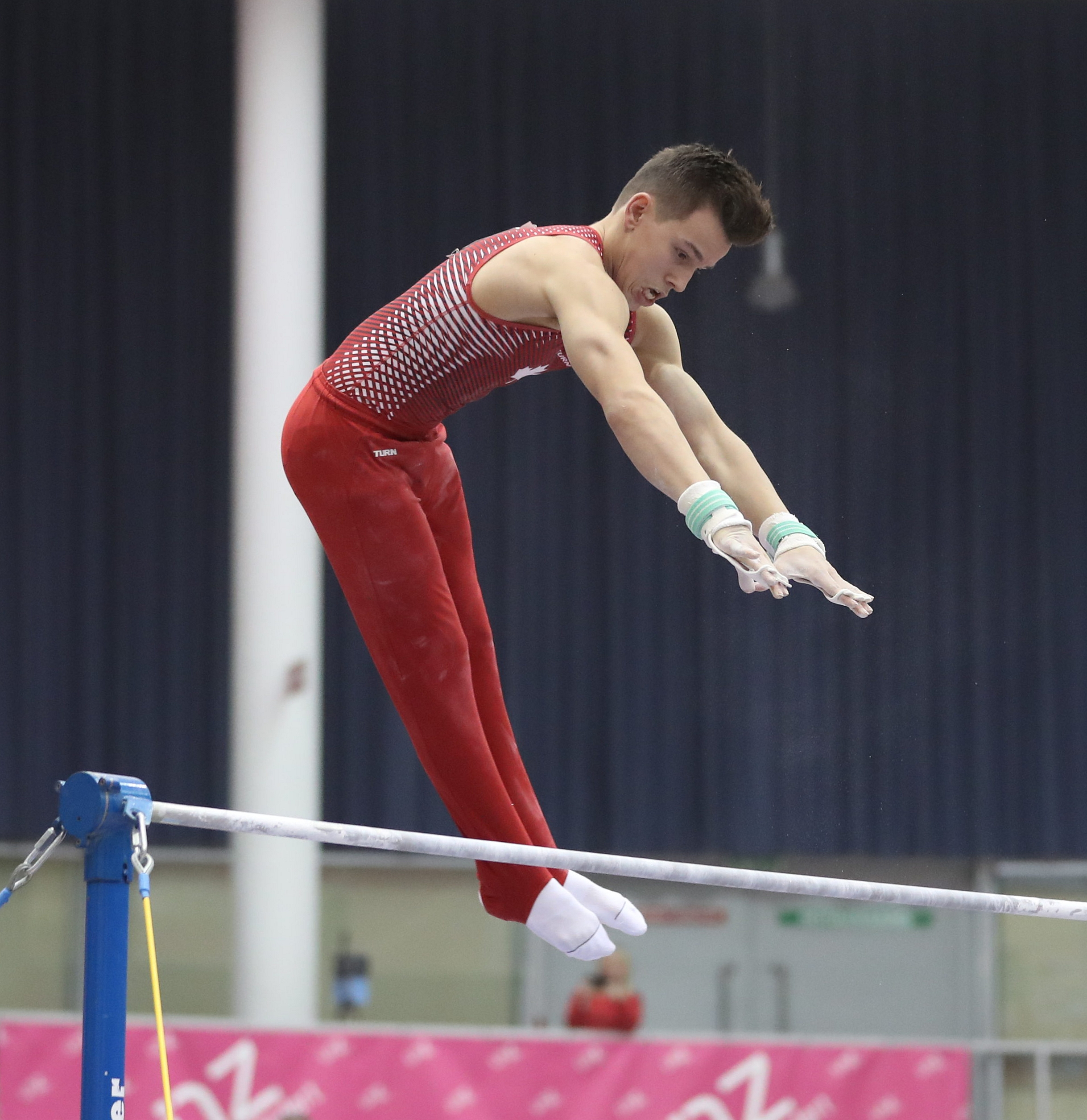

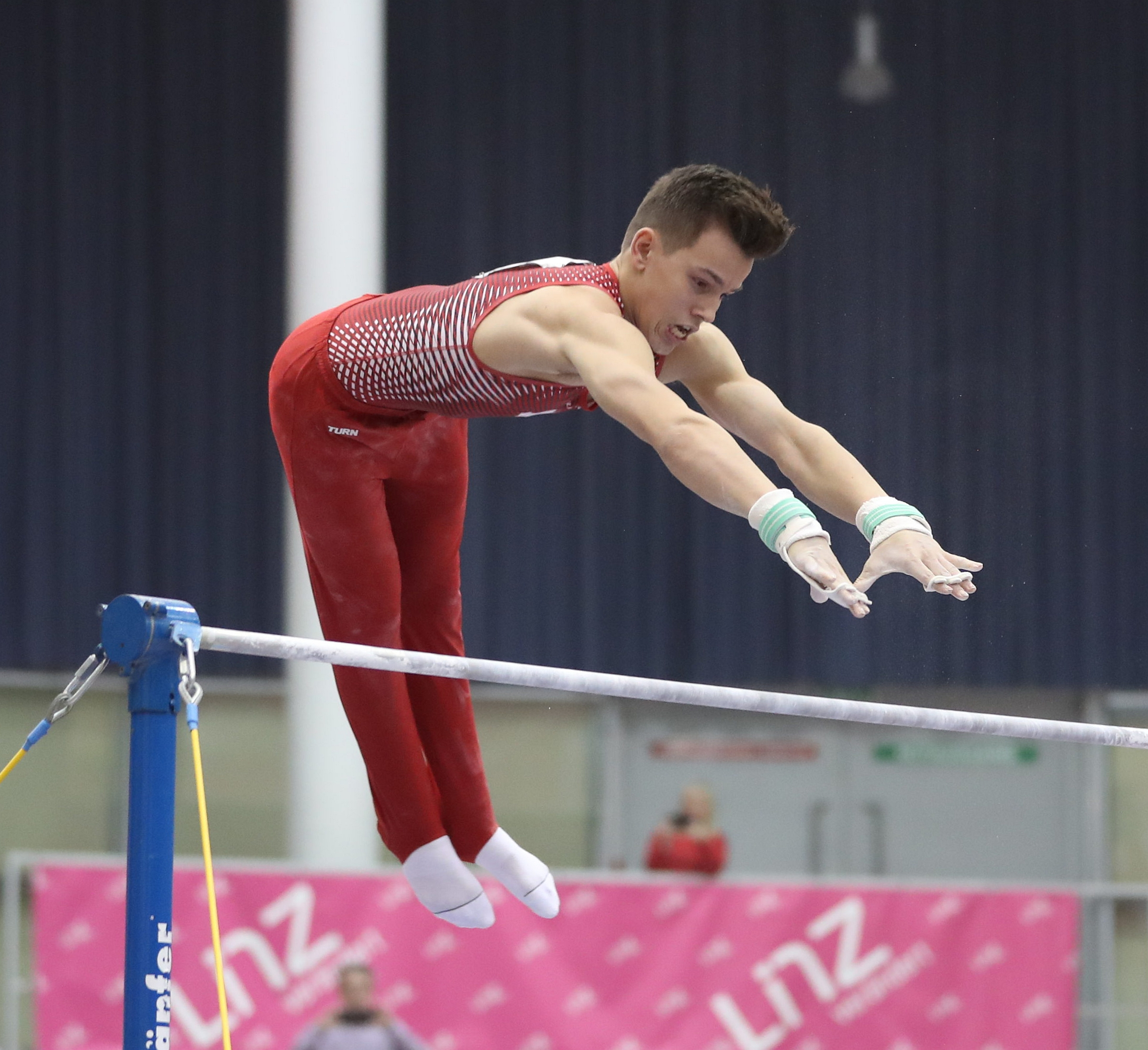

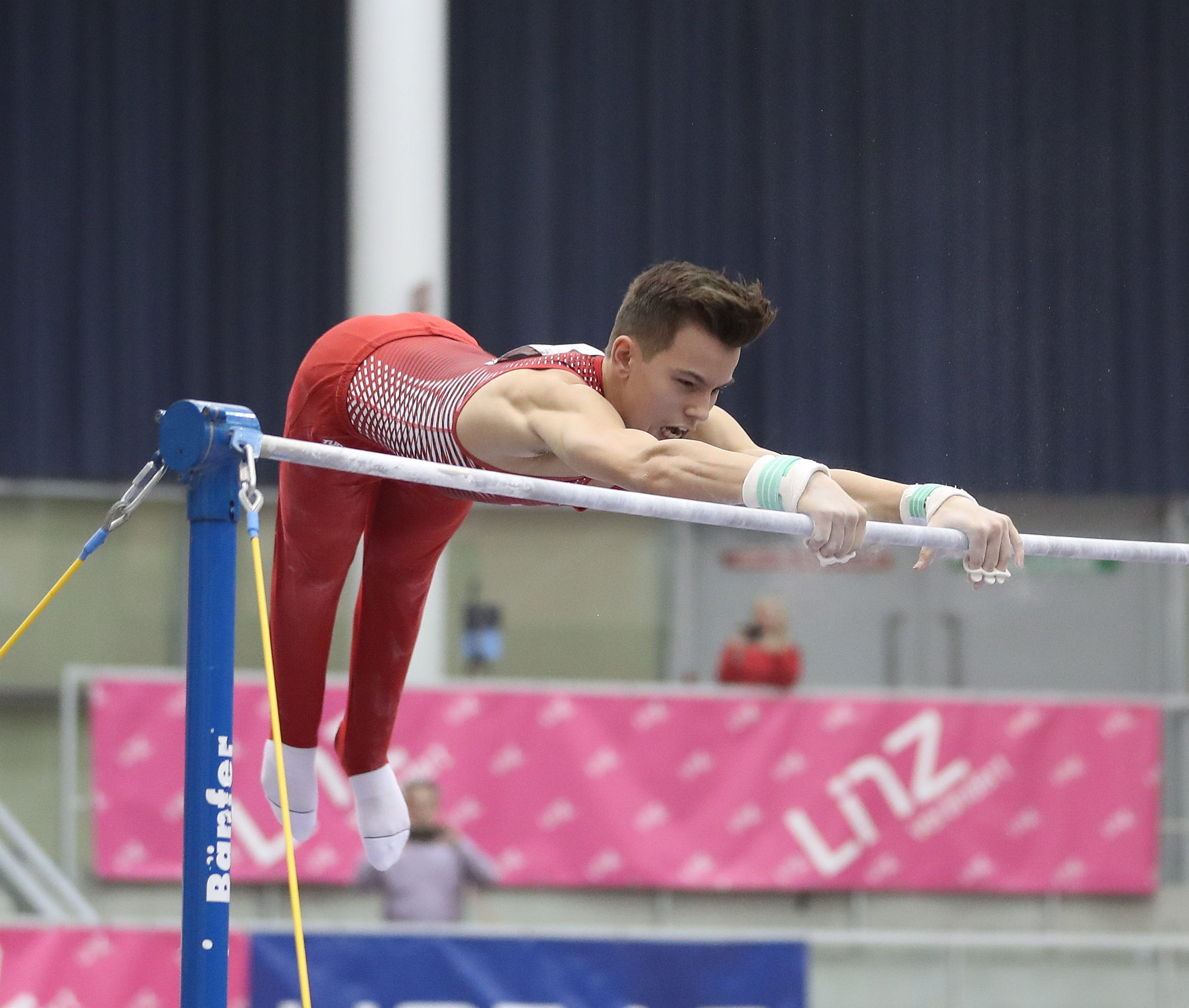

== W ==
Warm-up
The period and techniques that aim to warm up the gymnast's muscles to prevent injuring themselves while stretching or training.
Waterfall
Go in to a handstand then tuck your chin and arch your back

Wolf turn
Turn in a tuck stand on one leg - free leg optional. Performed on the balance beam or floor exercise. The triple wolf turn is named after Lauren Mitchell in the Code of Points for both balance beam and floor exercise.

Execution of the wolf turn

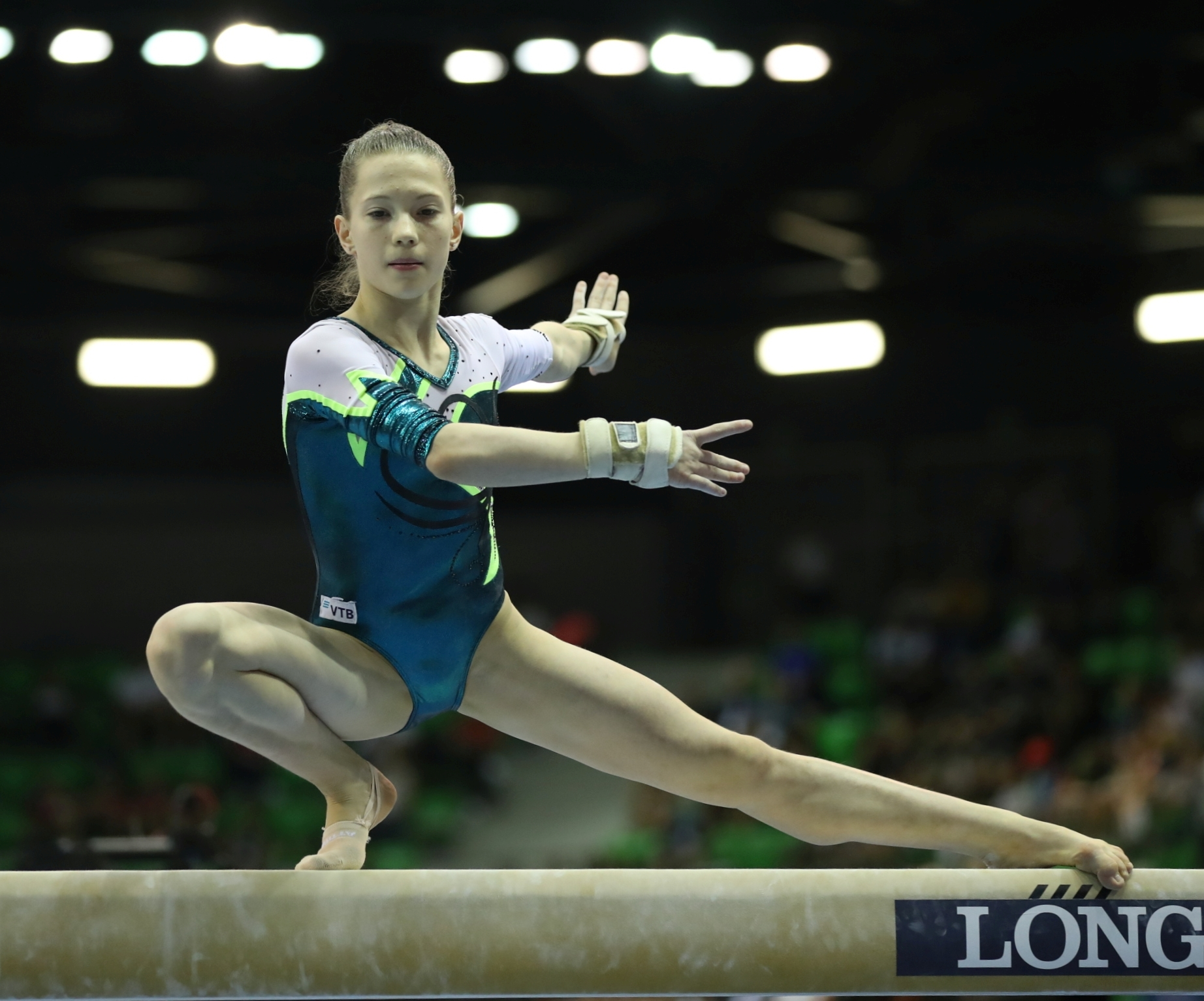
Performed by Vladislava Urazova at the 2019 Junior World Championships

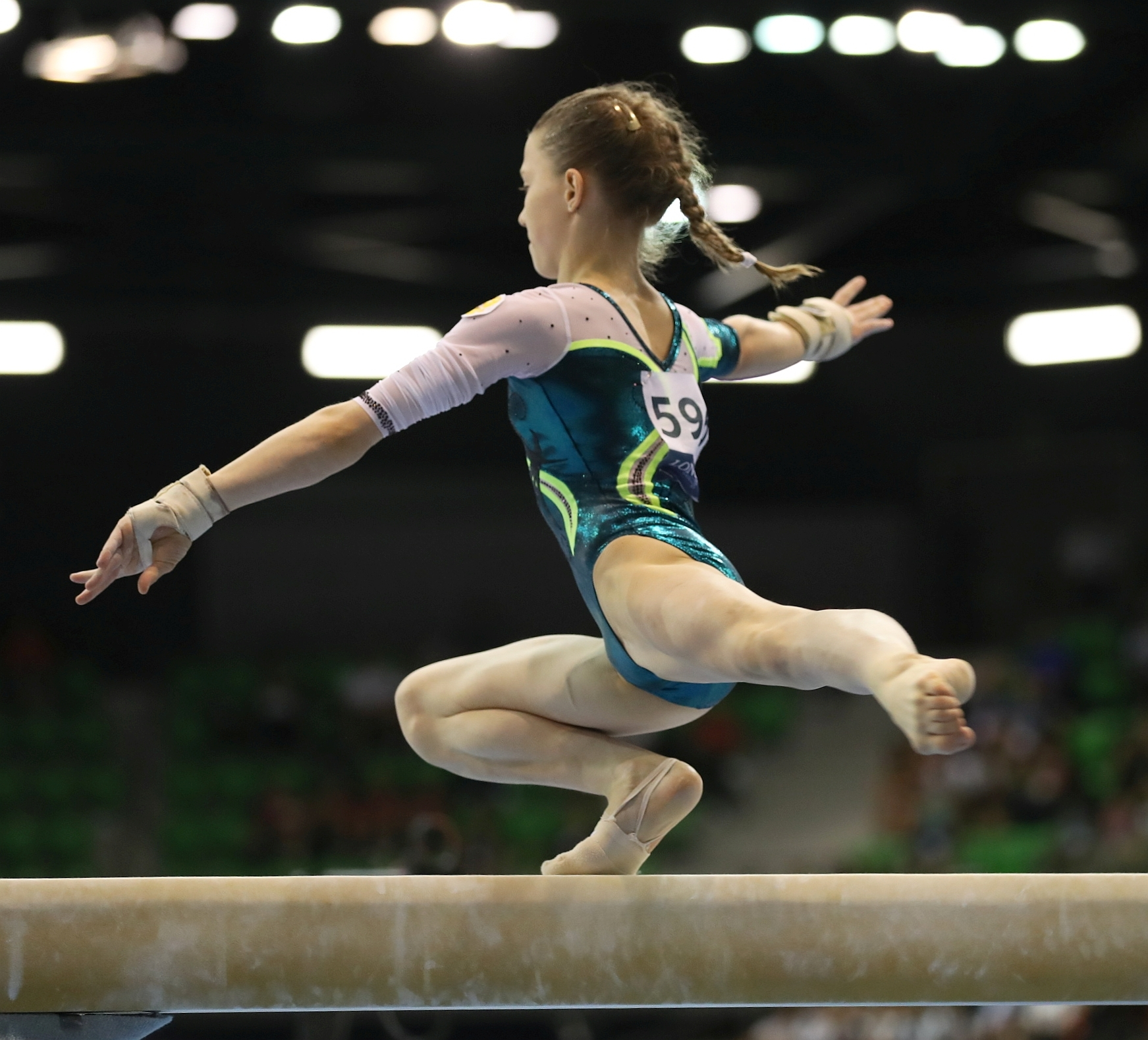
Performed by Vladislava Urazova at the 2019 Junior World Championships

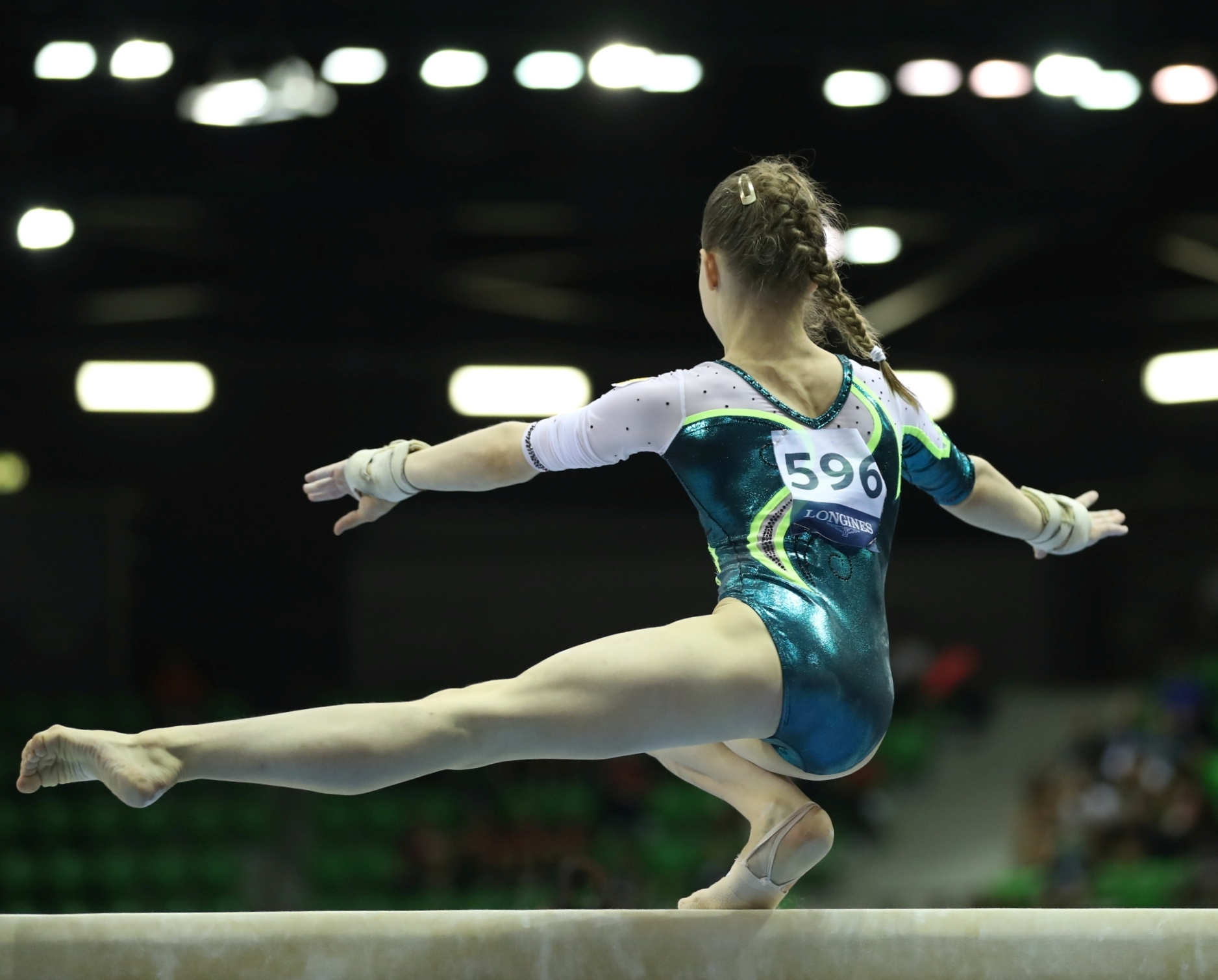
Performed by Vladislava Urazova at the 2019 Junior World Championships

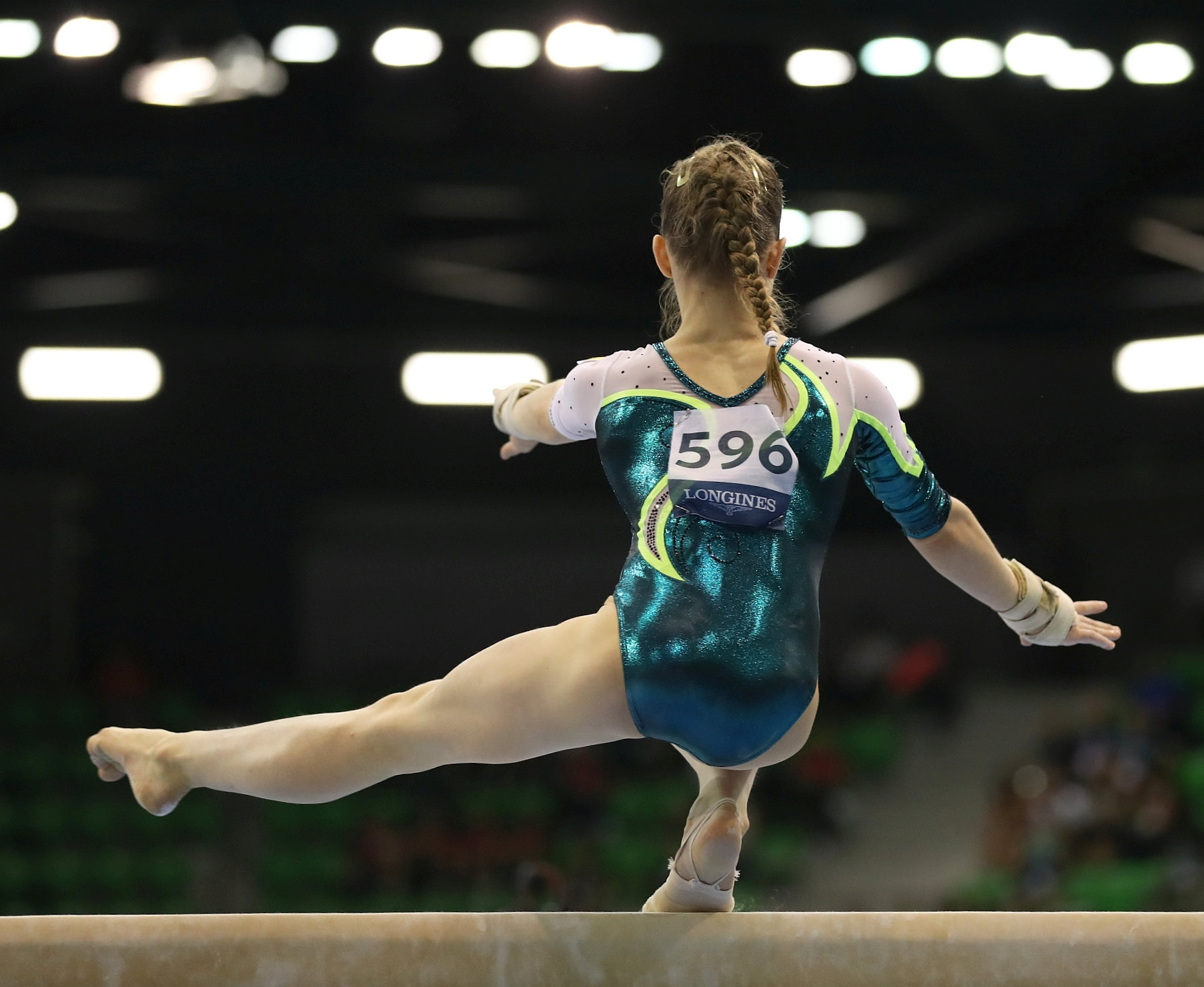
Performed by Vladislava Urazova at the 2019 Junior World Championships

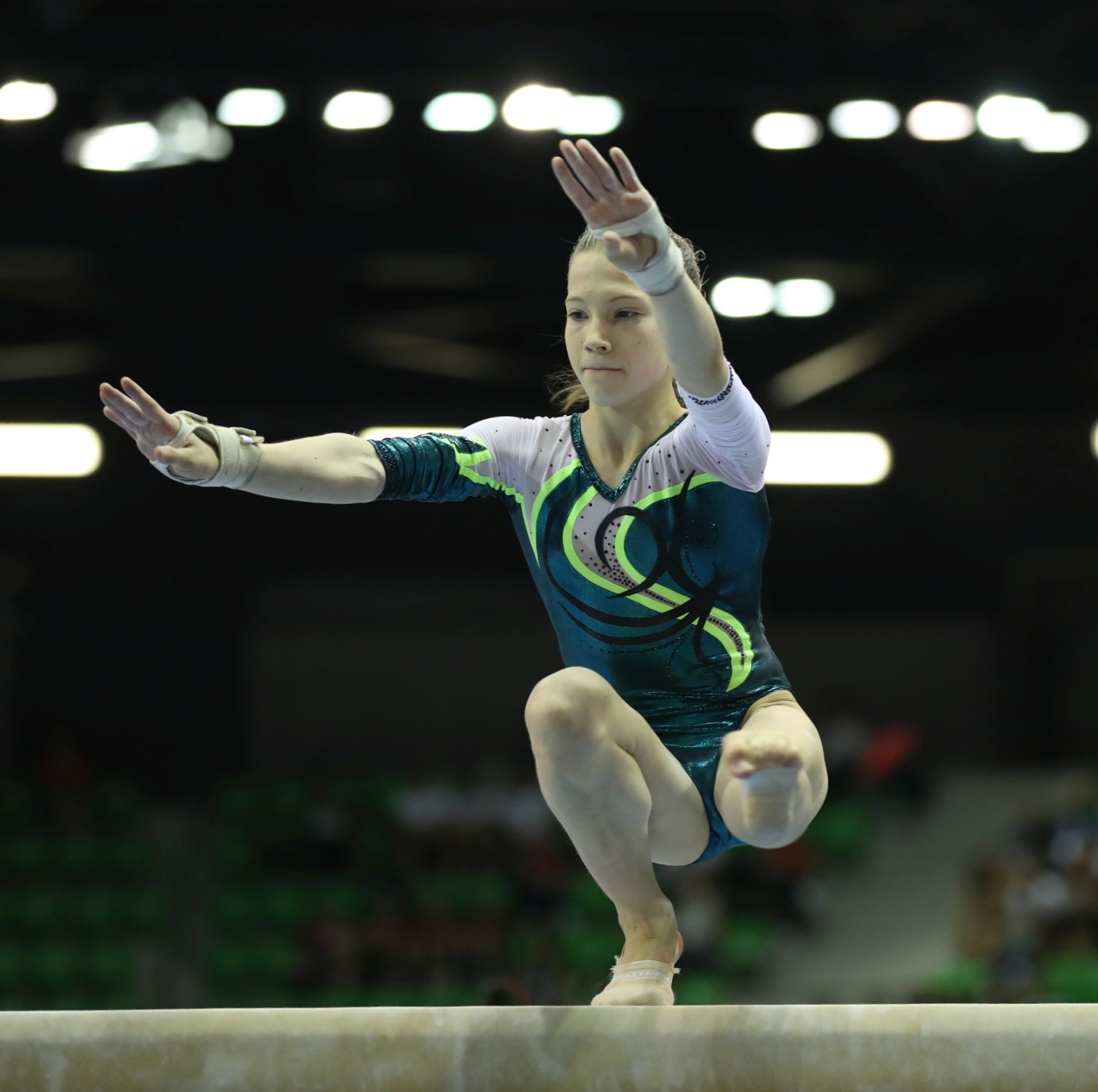
Performed by Vladislava Urazova at the 2019 Junior World Championships

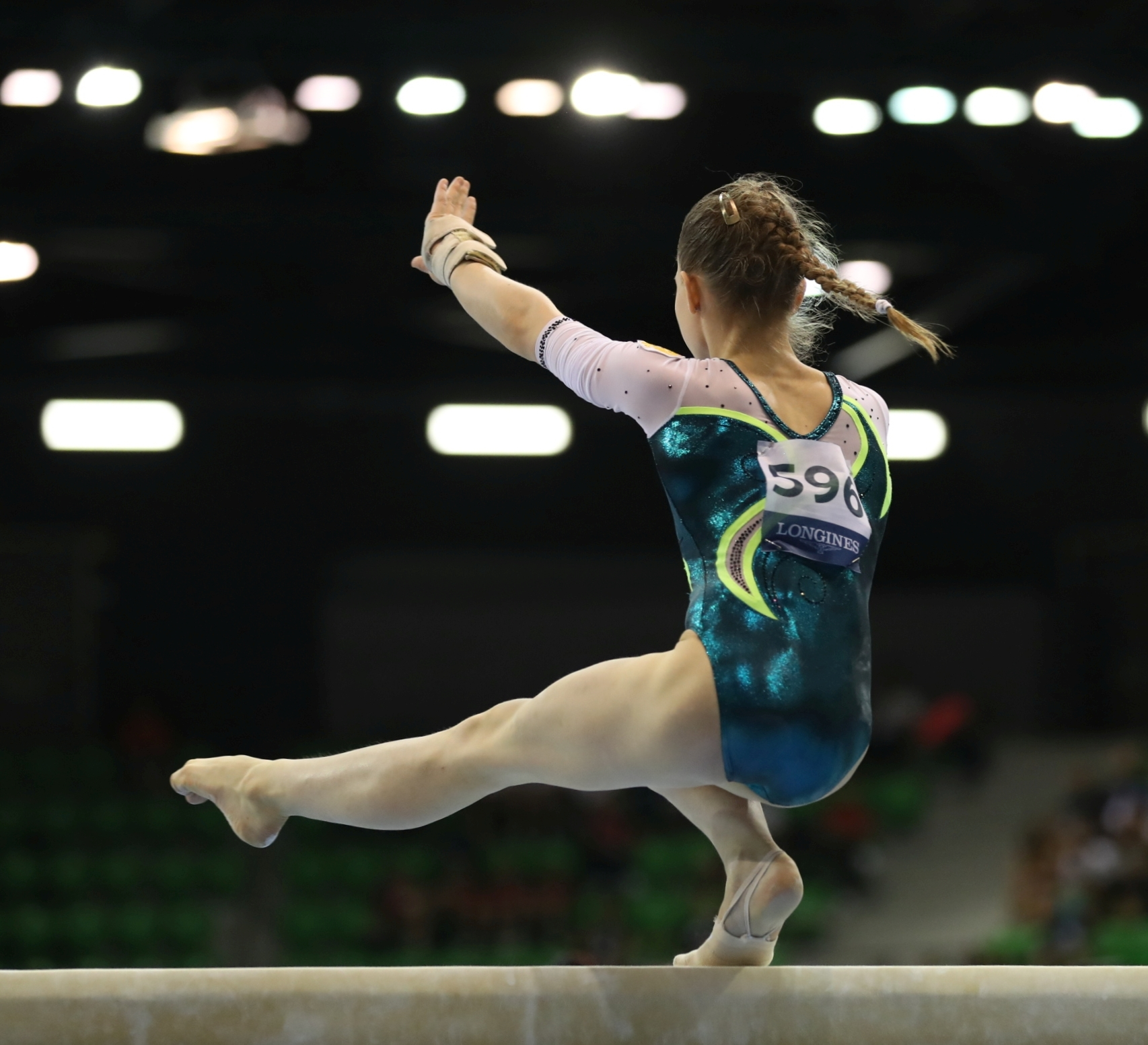
Performed by Vladislava Urazova at the 2019 Junior World Championships

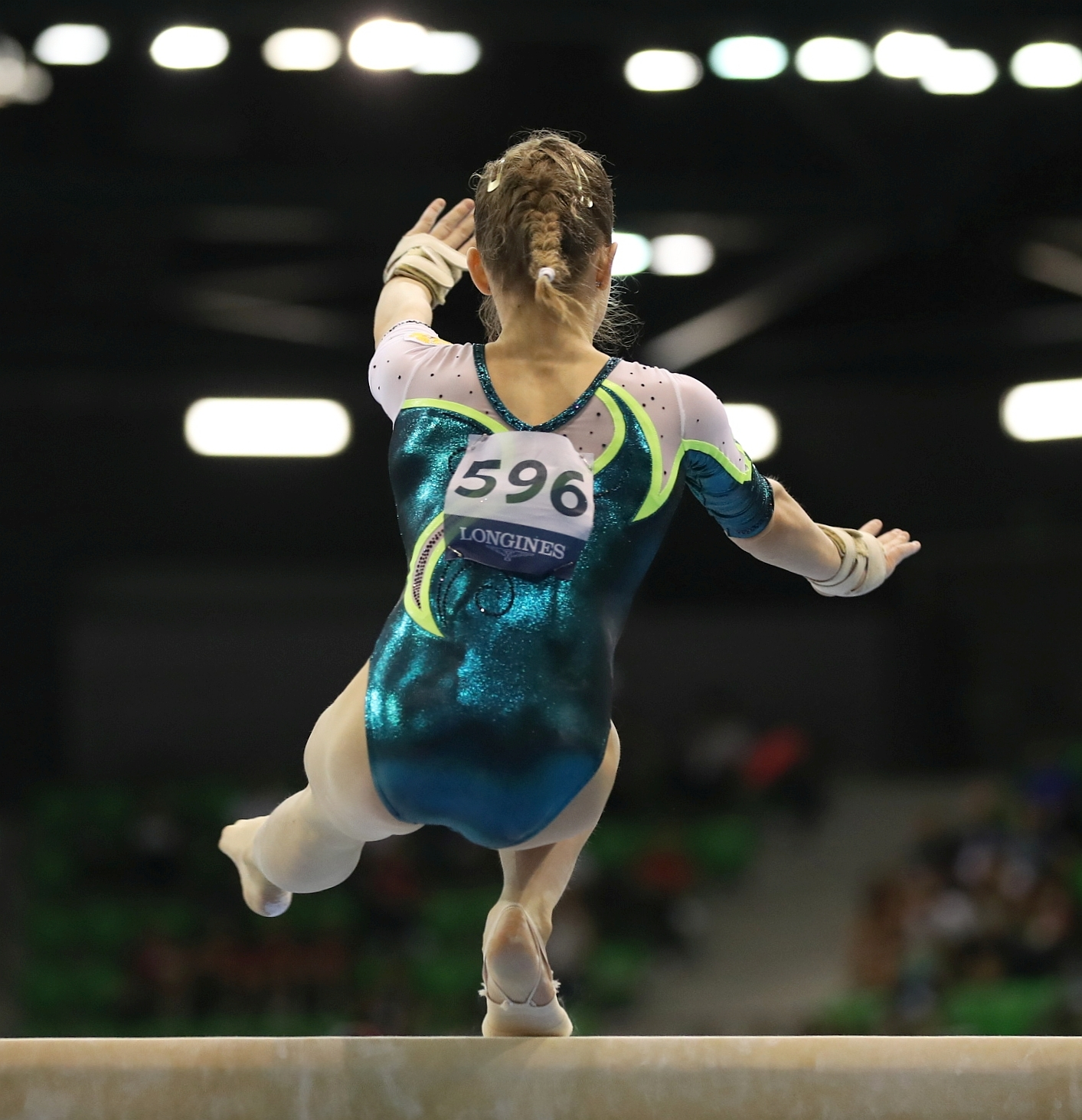
Performed by Vladislava Urazova at the 2019 Junior World Championships

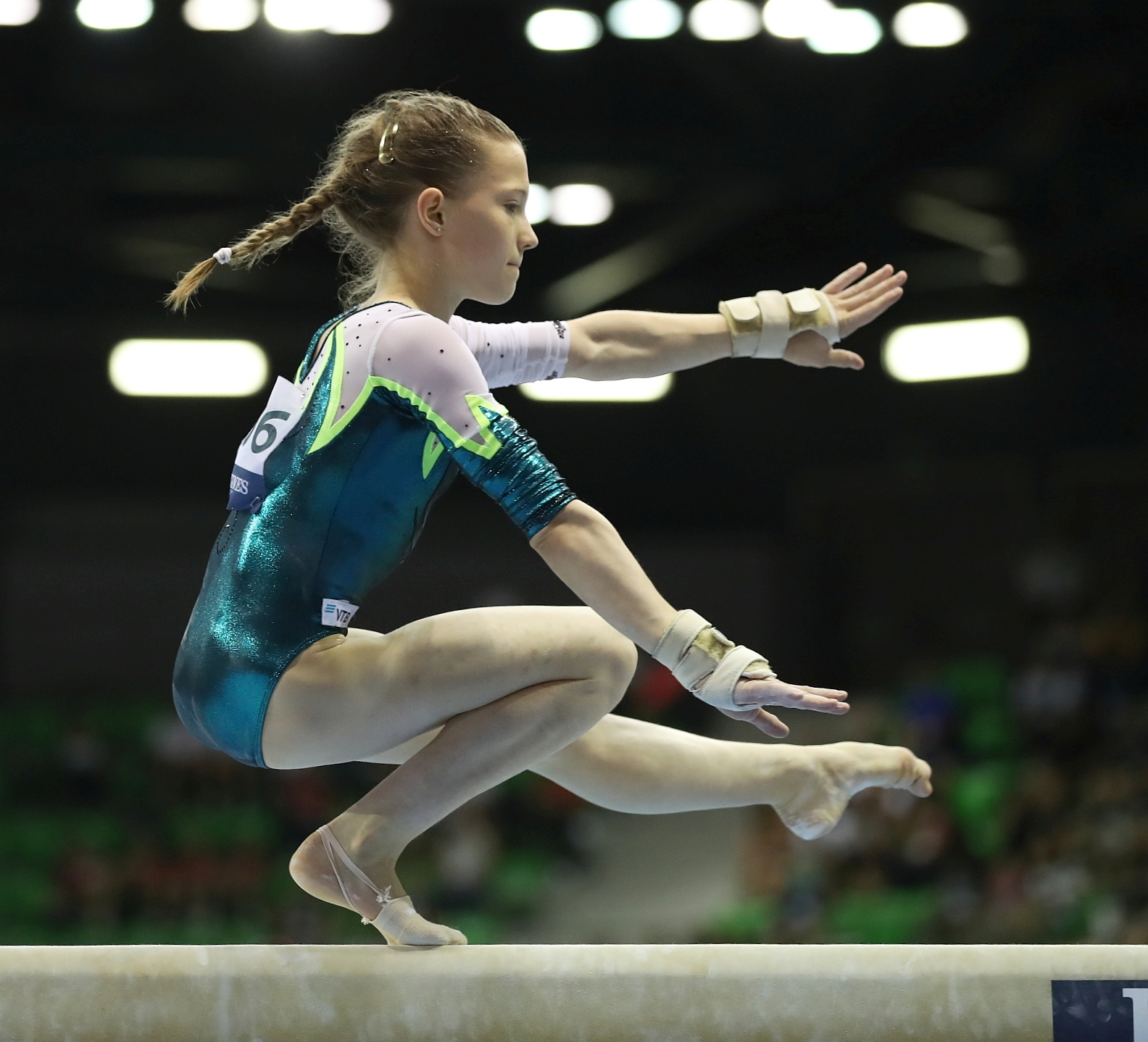
Performed by Vladislava Urazova at the 2019 Junior World Championships

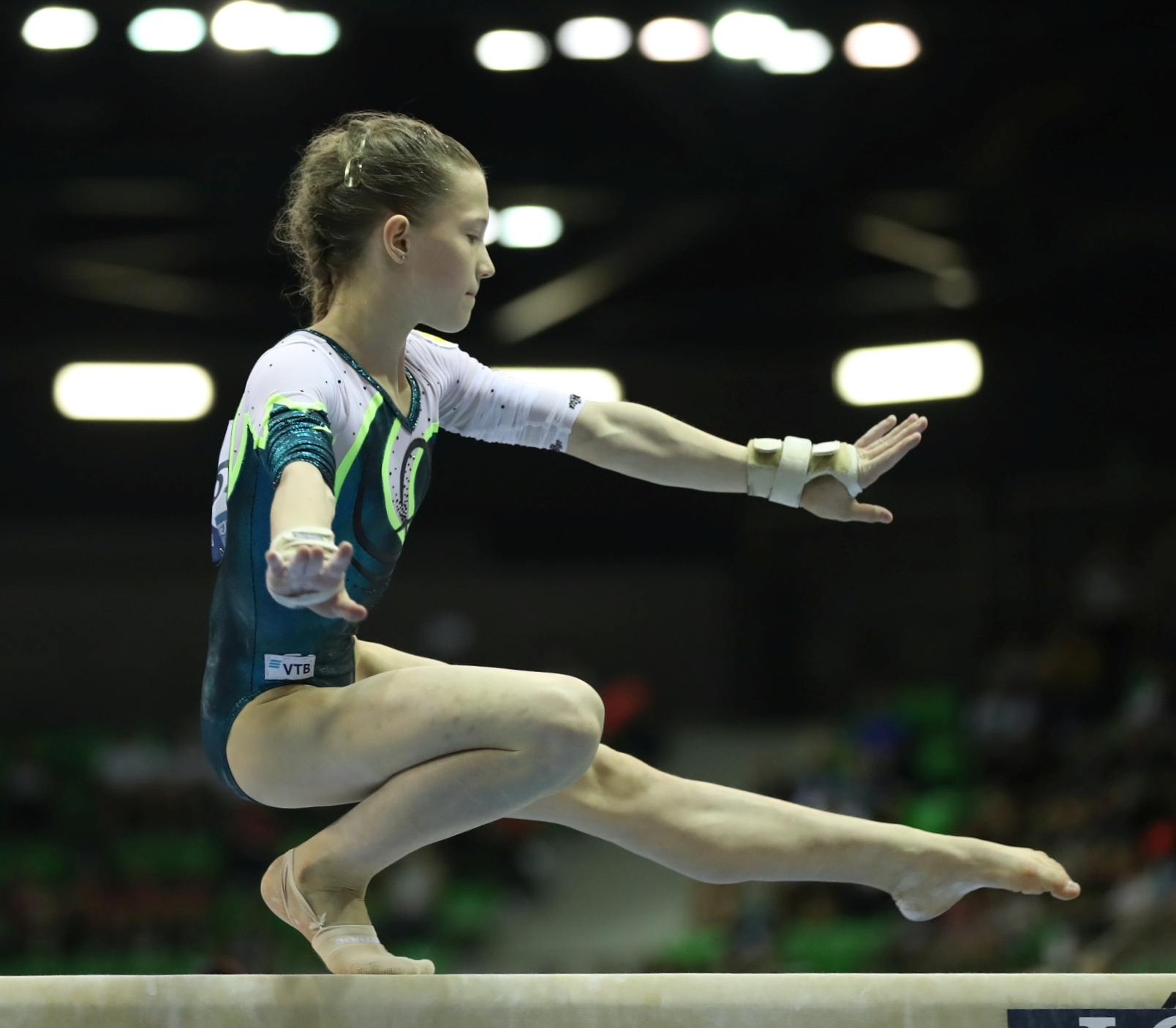
Performed by Vladislava Urazova at the 2019 Junior World Championships

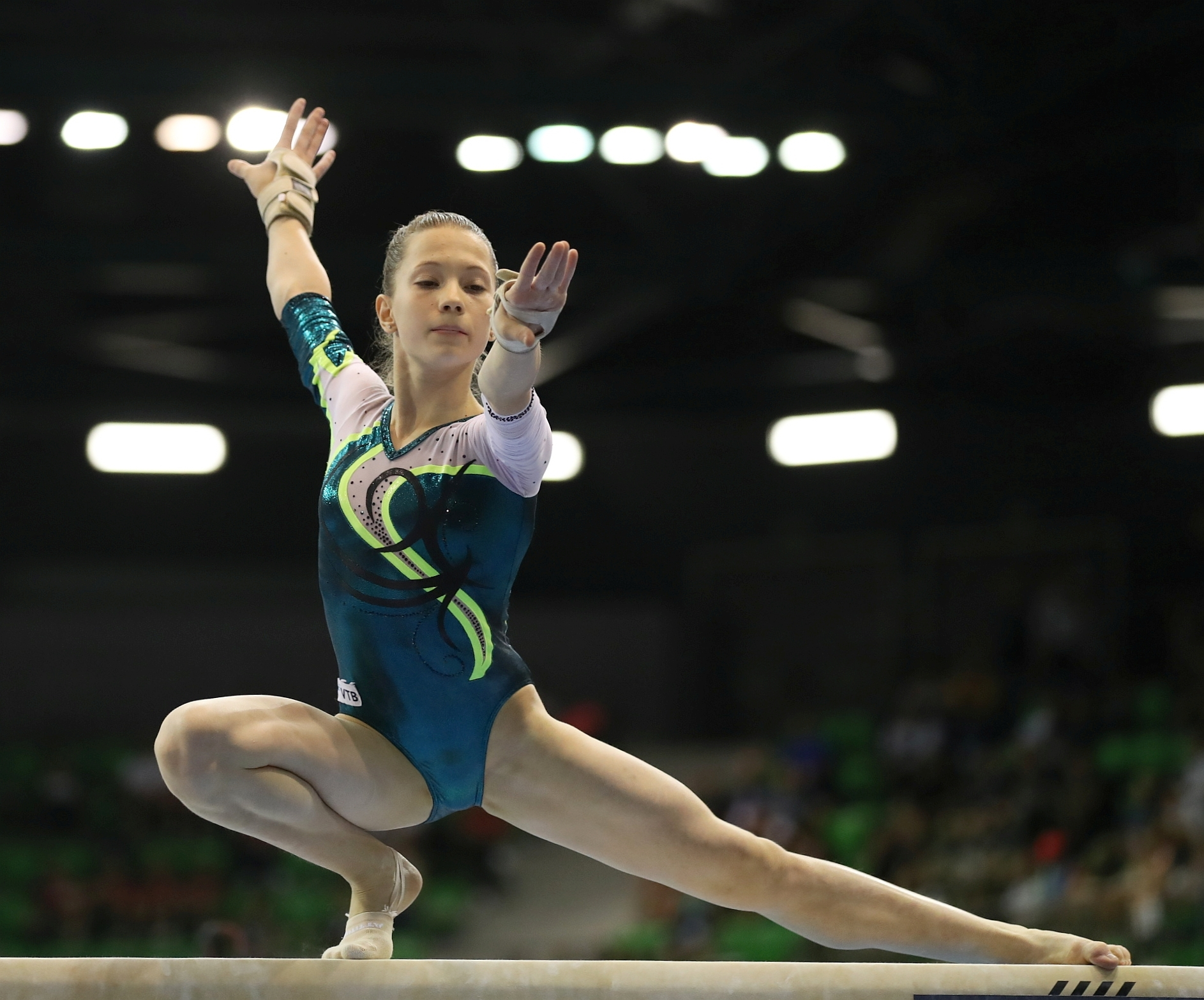
Performed by Vladislava Urazova at the 2019 Junior World Championships

== Y ==
Yurchenko loop
A balance beam skill in which the gymnast stands sideways on the beam, dives backwards into a back handspring (the "loop"), grasps the beam, performs a back hip circle and ends up in a front support position, resting on the hands. It is named after Natalia Yurchenko.
Yurchenko vault
A vault and a family of vaults. It consists of a round-off onto the springboard and a back handspring onto the horse or vaulting table, followed by a salto. Any vault with a roundoff-back handspring entry is classified as a "Yurchenko-style" vault. It is named after Natalia Yurchenko.
