= Eric Spoto =

American arm-wrestler and powerlifter (born 1976)

- Born: October 22, 1976 (age 49); Long Island, New York, U.S.
- Other name: "Vanilla Gorilla"
- Occupations: Powerlifting (bench press), Arm wrestling
- Employer: Super Training Gym (ST)
- Known for: Raw (unequipped) bench press world record
- Height: 5 ft 10 in (1.78 m)

Competition record

Powerlifting - Bench Press

Representing United States

Kings Of The Bench VIII (Hardcore Powerlifting)
1st	2012	+140kg

2012 SPF Mens Fall Open
Disqualified	2012	+140kg

SPF California State Championship 2013
1st	2013	+140kg

Eric D. Spoto (born October 22, 1976) is an American arm-wrestler and powerlifter, who specializes in the bench press. He previously held world record in the raw (unequipped) bench press with 722 lb (327.5 kg) achieved on May 19, 2013.

== Early life ==
Eric Spoto was born and raised in Long Island, New York. He was interested in strength sports and powerlifting from early on. In the 90s he moved to Las Vegas with his family. While having never competed in a powerlifting meet he started competing in armwrestling occasionally and had unofficial practice match victories against arm wrestling champions including Allen Fisher, Michael Todd, Dave Randall and Travis Bagent.

== Powerlifting career ==
Having previously trained with bench press world record-holder Scot Mendelson in Los Angeles, Spoto broke Mendelson's raw bench press world record of 715 pounds (324 kg). To achieve this, he paused his arm-wrestling career. Spoto became popular in the powerlifting scene after posting bench press videos on YouTube, showing him pressing in excess of 600 pounds (270 kg) for multiple repetitions while training at Mark Bell's Super Training Gym in Sacramento, California, with Stan Efferding and Creed Childress.

Eric entered his first official competition weighing 321 pounds (146 kg) on October 20, 2012, at Boad's Kings Of The Bench VII in Las Vegas, Nevada, where he bench pressed 660 pounds (300 kg) on his first and 700 pounds (320 kg) on his second attempt, becoming one of only three men in history hitherto to ever bench press 700 lb raw in an official competition and winning the prize money for the "Biggest Benchpress of the Show". Spoto also won the "500 Pound Strict-Bench-For-Reps Challenge" of the competition by pressing the 500 lb raw easily for ten repetitions with plenty more in the tank, outclassing the runner-up Al Davis by 3 reps.

In his second competition on November 3, 2012, at the 2012 SPF Mens Fall Open, titled "Backyard Meet of The Century", competing on the raw bench-only flight, Eric Spoto was expected to break the 715.0 lb raw record, but failed three times at attempting 716 pounds (325 kg).

At the 2013 Southern Powerlifting Federation (SPF) California State Powerlifting Meet in Sacramento, California on May 19, 2013, Spoto competed again and finally broke the record. Eric successfully bench pressed 661 pounds (300 kg) on his first, 716 lb on his second and 722 pounds (327.5 kg) on his third attempt wearing only a singlet, belt and wrist wraps. By pressing 722 lb raw Eric Spoto achieved the highest bench press ever performed without the aid of a bench shirt, surpassing the previous mark of 715 lb, set by Scot Mendelson 8 years before in 2005. Eric Spoto is currently the #3 ranked raw bench presser in the world, his record having been broken by Kirill Sarychev in 2015, and the latter's record by Julius Maddox on 19 March 2020 with a 770 pounds 350 kg press at the Arnold Sports Classic in Columbus.

=== Personal records ===
Powerlifting competition records:

done in official powerlifting meets

- Raw Bench press – 722.0 lb (327.5 kg) @ 315.5 lb (SHW) raw with only wrist wraps and belt (May 19, 2013, SPF)

Powerlifting gym records (unofficial):

done in the gym (based on video footage)

- Raw Bench press – 315 lb (143 kg) for 45 reps
- Raw Bench press – 405 lb (184 kg) for 26 reps
- Raw Bench press – 500 lb (230 kg) for 17 reps
- Raw Bench press – 605 lb (274 kg) for 8 reps
- Raw Bench press – 645 lb (293 kg) for 4 reps
- Raw Bench press – 675 lb (306 kg) for 3 reps
- Raw Bench press – 735 lb (333 kg) for 2 reps 3 board press
- Bench press – 725 lb (329 kg) for 2 reps with slingshot
- Bench press – 765 lb (347 kg) for 1 rep with slingshot
- Raw Bench Press Video Compilation https://ericspoto.com/videos/

== Personal life ==
Born on October 22, 1976, Eric Spoto grew up in Nesconset, New York. He was the second of three children born to Danny and Pauline Spoto. He has two sisters – Stephanie and Gary. Today, he lives in Henderson, Nevada, in the Las Vegas Valley.

== See also ==
- Progression of the bench press world record
- Scot Mendelson
- James Henderson
- Jim Williams
- Ted Arcidi
- Siamand Rahman
