= Siamand Rahman =

Iranian Paralympic powerlifter (1988-2020)

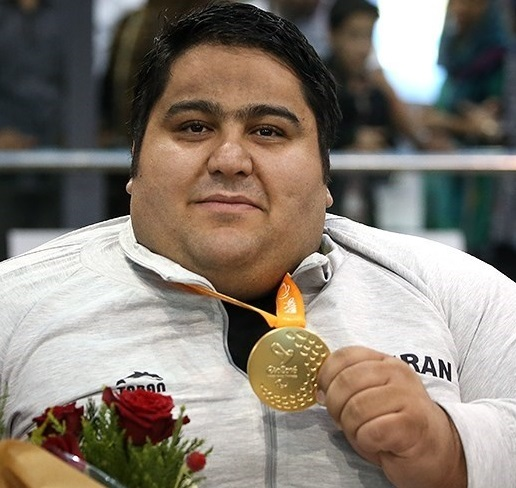
- Rahman in 2016

Personal information
- Nationality: Iranian
- Born: 21 March 1988 Oshnavieh, Iran
- Died: 1 March 2020 (aged 31) Oshnavieh, Iran
- Weight: 169 kg (373 lb)

Sport
- Sport: Paralympic powerlifting, Bench Press
Medal record
Men's Paralympic powerlifting
Representing Iran
Paralympic Games
Gold medal – first place	2012 London	+100 kg
Gold medal – first place	2016 Rio de Janeiro	+107 kg
Asian Para Games
Gold medal – first place	2010 Guangzhou	+100 kg
Gold medal – first place	2014 Incheon	+107 kg
Gold medal – first place	2018 Jakarta	+107 kg
IPC Powerlifting World Championships
Silver medal – second place	2010 Kuala Lumpur	+100 kg
Gold medal – first place	2014 Dubai	+107kg
Gold medal – first place	2017 Mexico City	+107kg
Gold medal – first place	2019 Nur-Sultan	+107kg

Siamand Rahman (Persian: سیامند رحمان; 21 March 1988 – 1 March 2020) was an Iranian Paralympic powerlifter. He won gold medals at the 2012 Summer Paralympics in London, 2016 Summer Paralympics in Rio, and the 2010 Asian Para Games in Guangzhou. He is the current IPC Powerlifting World Record holder and the Paralympic Championship Record holder in the +107 kg category with a 310 kilograms (680 lb) bench press and also holds the junior world record with 290 kilograms (640 lb). Siamand died on 1 March 2020 due to cardiac arrest.

== Powerlifting career ==
Despite Rahman suffering from disabilities affecting both legs due to polio, Rahman has been described as "the world's strongest Paralympian".

Rahman began his career in Oshnavieh, Iran, supported by his family and coach Ali Asghar in 2008. He appeared on the world stage for the first time at the 2010 IPC Powerlifting World Championships in Kuala Lumpur, Malaysia, where he competed in the men's +100 kg category and bench pressed 260.0 kilograms (573.2 lb) to win the silver medal, losing to teammate Karem Rajabi Golojeh. Rahman set a new IPC Powerlifting World Record in the +100 kg category on his fourth lift with a 285.0 kilograms (628.3 lb) bench press, but did not count toward his medal performance.

Months later, Rahman won the gold medal at the 2010 Asian Para Games in Guangzhou, China and broke the IPF Senior World Record in the +100 kg category with a lift of 290.0 kilograms (639.3 lb) on December 18, despite being eligible for the junior category.

Rahman broke his own world record again, lifting 291.0 kilograms (641.5 lb) at a competition in Sharjah, United Arab Emirates on December 4, 2011.

Rahman won gold at the 2012 Summer Paralympics in London, breaking the Paralympic championship record of 265 kilograms (584 lb) that was previously held by Iranian teammate Golojeh with his first lift of 270.0 kilograms (595.2 lb) and breaking it again with his second attempt of 280.0 kilograms (617.3 lb). With his successful lift of 280 kilograms (620 lb), Rahman was 38 kg beyond Faris Abed, who claimed the silver medal by lifting 242 kilograms (534 lb).

Despite his disability and young age, Rahman was close to breaking the all-time raw world record of 335 kilograms (739 lb) by Kirill Sarychev and had expressed goals of bench pressing in excess of 350 kilograms (770 lb) and 400 kilograms (880 lb) in competition.

Following the 2016 Paralympics, Rahman was named Best Male at the Paralympic Sport Awards.

=== Personal records ===
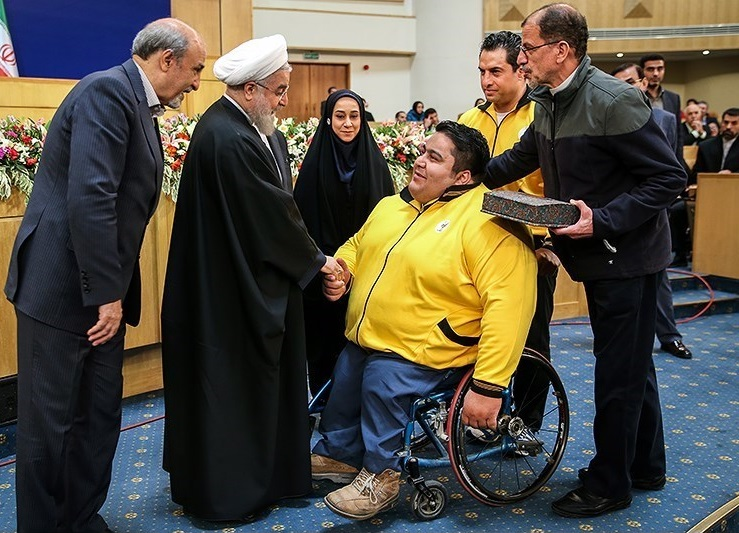
Rahman with Iranian President Hassan Rouhani

Powerlifting competition records:

done in official powerlifting meets

- Raw Bench press – 291.0 kg (641.5 lb) – +100 kg category – 2011-12-04
- Raw Bench press – 310.0 kg (683.4 lb) – +107 kg category – 2016-09-14

Powerlifting gym records (unofficial):

done in the gym (based on video footage)

- Raw Bench press – 311 kg (686 lb) – 2017-11-27

== Major results ==
Year	Venue	Weight	Attempts (kg)				Result (kg)	Rank
Year	Venue	Weight	1	2	3	4	Result (kg)	Rank
Paralympic Games
2012	London, United Kingdom	+100 kg	270.0	280.0	~~301.0~~	--	280.0 PR	1st place, gold medalist(s)
2016	Rio de Janeiro, Brazil	+107 kg	270.0	300.0	305.0	310.0 WR PR	305.0	1st place, gold medalist(s)
World Championships
2010	Kuala Lumpur, Malaysia	+100 kg	250	260	~~265~~	285	260	2nd place, silver medalist(s)
2014	Dubai, United Arab Emirates	+107 kg	275	281	285	285.5	285	1st place, gold medalist(s)
2017	Mexico City, Mexico	+107 kg	265	275	285	--	285	1st place, gold medalist(s)
2019	Nur-Sultan, Kazakhstan	+107 kg	250	265	--	--	265	1st place, gold medalist(s)

== See also ==
- Paralympic powerlifting world records
- Progression of the bench press world record
- Eric Spoto
- Big James Henderson
- Scot Mendelson
