= Kirill Sarychev =

Russian powerlifter (born 1989)

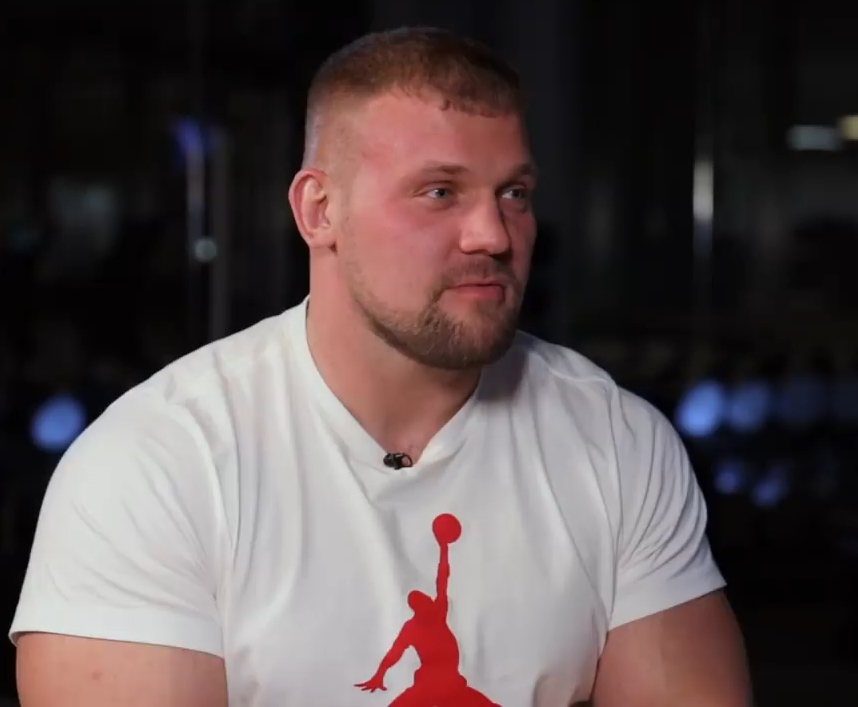
- Sarychev in March 2021
- Born: 1 January 1989 (age 37); Pugachyov, Saratov oblast, Soviet Union (now Russia)
- Occupation: Powerlifter
- Height: 199 cm (6 ft 6 in)

Kirill Igorevich Sarychev (Russian: Кирилл Игоревич Сарычев; born 1 January 1989) is a Russian powerlifter. He previously held the world record in the raw bench press with a lift of 335 kg (738.5 lb). In 2016, he set a world record raw three-lift powerlifting total in the Superheavyweight class.

== Personal life ==
Sarychev was born on 1 January 1989 in the town of Pugachyov, Saratov Oblast. His father was also large, standing at 193 cm (6 ft 4 in) and weighing 130 kg (287 lb).

Sarychev graduated with honours from School No. 1, Pugachev, Saratov Oblast, and then from the Pugachyov Hydrological Land Improvement Technical College in 2007. In 2012 he earned a degree from the Saratov State Vavilov Agrarian University.

== Powerlifting career ==
Sarychev first became interested in powerlifting at the age of 15. At the time while weighing 72 kg (158.7 lb), he benched 90 kg (198.4 lb), squatted 90 kg (198.4 lb), and deadlifted 110 kg (242.5 lb). He soon found coach Victor Mikheyev and made rapid progress, including preparing for competitions in the International Powerlifting Federation (IPF). He preferred to lift without equipment (raw) but was unable to keep up with other powerlifters who competed in the IPF if he did not use equipment. In his first Russian Championships from 2007 to 2009 he competed in single ply equipment with a bodyweight of 150–152 kg (330.7–335.1 lb) as a teenager.

In 2009, while at the World Powerlifting Congress World Championships in Rostov-on-Don, Sarychev met Andrey Fedoseyev, who invited him to compete at the 2010 Battle of Champions, held in Arkhangelsk. The competition was a 'raw' push and pull event (bench press and deadlift only) and Sarychev participated in both. Deadlift placement was determined by the Glossbrenner formula; he placed fifth, pulling 320 kg (705.5 lb) raw. On the bench press, he placed first, pressing 300 kg (661.4 lb) raw, at the age of 21. After this event, Sarychev began training under Boris Sheiko.

=== Bench press world record ===
Sarychev competed again at the Battle of Champions in 2011 this time with bench only, winning silver with 300 kg (661.4 lb) raw, and for the third time in 2012, this time winning gold with a 315 kg (694.5 lb) raw bench press which made him the fourth heaviest raw benchpresser at the time behind Scot Mendelson (324.3 kg (715.0 lb) in 2005), James Henderson (322.5 kg (711.0 lb) in 1997).

At the 2013 Battle of Champions, Sarychev became the third man in history to bench press 317.5 kg (700 lb) raw, after, Henderson, Mendelson and Eric Spoto, reaching the milestone at the age of 24 at a bodyweight of 173.3 kg (382.1 lb). To this day, Sarychev is the youngest man to bench press 700 lb raw.

At the 2014 Battle of Champions, Sarychev bench pressed 320 kg (705.5 lb) raw and then 326 kg (718.7 lb) raw, surpassing Mendelson and Henderson's former world records. In the all-time list, he was now only behind Eric Spoto, whose 2013 world record stood at 327.5 kg (722.0 lb).

In 2015, at WPC SN PRO Open Cup, Sarychev bench pressed 330 kg (727.5 lb) raw in his second attempt breaking Spoto's world record for the heaviest raw bench press of all-time. In his third attempt, Sarychev raised it even further, with 335 kg (738.5 lb) raw, breaking the all-time record for the second time on the same day. The record remained unbeaten until 2019, when Julius Maddox benched 335.5 kg (739.7 lb).

=== Creation of World Raw Powerlifting Federation ===
In 2014, Sarychev founded a new powerlifting federation, the World Raw Powerlifting Federation (WRPF), and became its president. He has stated he hopes to see powerlifting become an Olympic sport.

In 2016, Sarychev set a world record with raw three-lift powerlifting total in SHW class at 1,072.5 kg (2,364.5 lb). He benched 320 kg (705.5 lb), squatted 350 kg (771.6 lb), and deadlifted 402.5 kg (887.4 lb). He also did a successful fourth attempt 360 kg (793.7 lb) squat, but it was not included in the official total. Had it been included, it would have been the all-time raw powerlifting total world record irrespective weight classes.

== Grip strength ==
In 2016, Sarychev got certified on the Captains of Crush – No.3 gripper which requires 127 kg (280 lb)/ RGC 149 of pressure to close. It is widely known as the gold standard of world class crush grip strength.

In 2025, Sarychev broke the double overhand Apollon's axle deadlift world record with a lift of 240 kg (529 lb). It is another highly regarded feat of grip strength in the sport of armlifting.
