= Ryan Kennelly =

American powerlifter (born 1974)

- Born: Ryan Shawn Kennelly; March 23, 1974 (age 52)
- Other names: "The Bench Monster"
- Occupations: Powerlifting, Personal trainer
- Employer: "Sleek Physique"
- Known for: World record in the equipped bench press
- Height: 6 ft 3 in (1.91 m)

Competition record

Powerlifting - Bench Press

Representing United States

WPO World Record Bench Bash
2nd	2002	+140kg
1st	2003	+140kg
3rd	2004	+140kg
1st	2005	+140kg
1st	2006	+140kg

WPO Bench Bash For Cash
6th	2001	+140kg
1st	2005	+140kg
1st	2007	+140kg

World Power Stars International Meet
1st	2007	UNL

World Power Stars
1st	2007	+140kg

Ryan Shawn Kennelly (born March 23, 1974) is an American powerlifter who specializes in the bench press. He held the World Powerlifting Organization (WPO) record and held the all-time world record in the Equipped (geared) bench press with a lift of 1075.0 lbs (487.6 kg) from November 2008 until April 2013. This world record is classified as an equipped world record, meaning the lift is performed with the aid of a bench shirt. He bench pressed an unequipped 650.0 lbs (294.8 kg) in competition.

== Early life ==
Kennelly, a native of Tri-Cities, Washington, grew up in a weightlifting family—his father was a competitive powerlifter. Kennelly is a 1992 graduate of Kamiakin High School in Kennewick. He didn't start weight training until he was 18 years old, and he didn't get serious about powerlifting until five years later, when an ongoing best-bench contest at his local gym inspired him to bench press more than 400 pounds to take top honors. Kennelly is 6 feet 2 inches (188 cm), making him one of the tallest bench press specialists in active competition.

== Powerlifting career ==
Kennelly broke the equipped bench press world record for the first time on July 28, 2007 by pressing 1036 lbs (470 kg) at the big Ukraine Bench for Cash meet - surpassing the previous world record of Gene Rychlak by 26 pounds. A few months later on December 1, he pressed 1050 lbs (477.27 kg) for another world record.

In 2008, he broke his own record again three times:

On April 12, 2008, Kennelly set the bench press record with a lift of 1070 lbs (485.3 kg) during the American Powerlifting Association Open Iron War held in Kennewick, Washington.

On July 13, 2008, Kennelly successfully bench pressed 1074.8 lbs (487.5 kg) during the United Powerlifting Association Bench Bash For Cash in Dubuque, Iowa.

Finally, on November 8, 2008, Kennelly broke the bench pressed record again with 1075.0 lbs (487.6 kg) at the Pride Strength Wars held in Kennewick, Washington for the current WPO equipped bench press world record.

On September 5, 2013, Kennelly was sentenced to 30 months in federal prison for importing anabolic steroids from India.

=== Official competition records ===
- Raw bench press – 650.0 lbs (294.8 kg) (raw with only wrist wraps and a belt) (done on October 18, 2010, UPA)
- Equipped bench press – 1075.0 lbs (487.6 kg) (done on November 8, 2008, WPO)

== See also ==
- Progression of the bench press world record
- Scot Mendelson
- Gene Rychlak
