= Jim Williams (powerlifter) =

American powerlifter (1940–2007)

- Born: February 25, 1940; Scranton, Pennsylvania
- Died: January 23, 2007 (aged 66)
- Other names: "Big Jim Williams", "Chimesy", "The Scranton Superman", "King of the Bench Press", "The Big Black Bear of Scranton"
- Occupation: powerlifting
- Height: 6 ft 1 in (1.85 m)

Competition record

Powerlifting

Representing United States

AAU World Powerlifting Championships
2nd	1971	+110kg
2nd	1972	+110kg

AAU US National Powerlifting Championships
2nd	1969	+110kg
5th	1970	+110kg

James Talbot Williams (February 25, 1940 – January 23, 2007) was an American powerlifter. He competed in powerlifting just prior to the formation of the International Powerlifting Federation (IPF). During the early-1970s, he set bench press national and world records in the Amateur Athletic Union (AAU). On November 9, 1972, he bench pressed of 675 lbs (with ace bandages on elbows/without a bench shirt). Jim Williams was the first man to bench press 300 kg (661.41 bs) in competition.

== Early career ==
Born in Scranton, Pennsylvania, Williams was exceptional in size and strength from a young age. By the time he was 12 years old, he weighed 200 pounds and excelled in both football and track and field. Williams reached the state finals in the shot put four times, ultimately winning once. Even when he weighed 340 pounds, he was capable of dunking a basketball.

== Early life ==
In his early life Big Jim Williams became involved in criminal activity and in 1961 was sentenced to ten years in prison for assault, battery and strong-arm robbery. It was there in captivity when Williams took up lifting weights seriously. When he was released, he was a success in the powerlifting world, along with his training partner John Kuc.

== Powerlifting career ==
Williams' first major goal was to break the world record of 615 pounds of Pat Casey, the first man to bench press 600 pounds.

On August 30, 1969, he crossed the 600 lb barrier to become only the second man in history to achieve an official 600 lb bench press. Williams broke Casey's world record in 1971 at the Eastern USA Open, pressing 635 pounds, which was recognized as the American record.

On November 6, 1971, at the inaugural AAU World Championships, Williams set another record with a 660 pound bench press. He was also the favorite to win the World Championships, but came in second to Hugh Cassidy, who totaled 2,160 pounds as well, but being lighter got the victory for having the lower bodyweight.

On November 9, 1972, in Harrisburg, Pennsylvania, at the second World Powerlifting Championships, Williams achieved second place again, this time behind training partner John Kuc. He also made his best official bench result with a 675 pounds press with only ace bandages of a specified length on his elbows, wearing a T-shirt and singlet. This lift would have been recognized as the official world record, but it was done one year before the International Powerlifting Federation (IPF) was formed and began keeping "official" world records. Still, Williams' 675 pound bench press went into the books as an American Record and it was the all-time bench press world record, regardless of governing organization. In addition to that, it stood as the American record in the AAU and later in the USPF for over 20 years from November 9, 1972, until July 31, 1994, when Anthony Clark established a new mark at 683 pounds with the help of a bench shirt. Williams had attempted 700 at the 1972 World Championships and got it 3/4 of the way up. Although he never did it in competition, Williams had reportedly done 700 pounds in training, with a best of 720 pounds. The powerlifter John Kuc was one of the witnesses of Williams' 700 pounds bench press (as well as three international referees) at the York Gym and stated: "That was more enjoyable to watch than the 675 (official) lift, but it wasn't official." Williams always lifted in a raw fashion – supportive equipment was not available in his day, and a two-second pause at the chest was required. Many experts consider him to be one of the greatest bench pressers of all time.

Although known for his bench pressing, Williams also broke the world record in the squat, with 865 lbs, and did 1,200 lbs unofficially, which he said was about 3-4 inches above parallel. His best training lifts included a squat of 900 and a deadlift of 815, even though he did not have good leverages for the deadlift and did not focus on it in his training.

== Life after competition ==
His lifting career was not long and Williams did not compete officially after 1973. Shortly after the 1972 World Championships, the U.S. Secret Service arrested Williams and charged him with counterfeiting. In late 1979, he trained for a comeback, but suffered a tear in his quadriceps, which ultimately ended his attempt as well as his lifting career.

== Personal records ==
=== Powerlifting competition records ===
In official Powerlifting full meets.

- Squat - 865 lbs (392.35 kg) raw with ace-bandage knee wraps
- Bench Press: 675.0 lbs (306.2 kg) raw with ace-bandage elbow wraps, performed with a 2 second pause, which was required in those days
  - former official all-time bench press AAU (later USPF) American record in SHW class (+regardless of weight class and equipment) for more than 21 years from November 9, 1972, to July 31, 1994
  - former all-time bench press world record in SHW class (+regardless of weight class and federation) for more than 12 years from November 9, 1972, to March 3, 1985
  - former all-time raw bench press world record in SHW class (+regardless of weight class and federation) for more than 23 years from November 9, 1972, to July, 1996
- Deadlift: 725.1 lb (328.9 kg) raw
- Total: 2240 lbs (860/655/725) / 1016.0 kg (390/297/329) raw with ace-bandage wraps (2235 lbs (855/655/725), which later weighed out at 2240 lbs (860/655/725)) on 5/6/1972 (AAU)

=== Powerlifting gym records (unofficial) ===
- Squat: 900 lbs raw with ace-bandage knee wraps
- Bench press:720 lbs raw - personal gym record

700 lbs raw - multiple times under eyewitnesses including in York Gym in 1972 in the presence of three international referees and in the basement of Bob Gaynor
715 lbs raw - in Pfeffer's Athletic Club in Scranton in 1979 or 1980

- Deadlift: 860 lbs raw

== Death ==
Williams died on January 23, 2007, at age 66, after having diabetes for over 12 years.

== Quotes about Williams ==
Former super heavyweight world powerlifting champion John Kuc said about Williams:

"Jimmy had more potential than anyone other than Paul Anderson. I truly think with proper training he could have totaled over 2,500 pounds without equipment."

His friend and fellow powerlifting legend Don Reinhoudt stated that Jim Williams in his opinion is "the very greatest bench presser of all time".

Iron game historian Dr. Terry Todd, said Jim Williams was one of the strongest super heavyweight lifters he had ever seen:

"I would definitely place Jim Williams’ benching in the top ten, along with such stalwarts such as Paul Anderson’s squat, Bill Kazmaier’s dumbbell pressing, Vasily Alekseyev’s cleaning, Zydrunas Savickas’ overall power, Mikhail Koklyaev’s pull, Andy Bolton’s deadlifting and Mark Henry’s grip strength."

Joe Ladnier, multiple time World Champion:

"I never met Big Jim, but he was one of the strength legends that I admired from Day 1. R.I.P. Big Jim."

== See also ==
- Progression of the bench press world record
- Big James Henderson
- Scot Mendelson
- Ted Arcidi
- Anthony Clark
- John Kuc
- Jon Cole
- Hugh Cassidy
