= Ted Arcidi =

American professional wrestler, model, actor, powerlifter

- Arcidi at Fanfest 2026

Personal information
- Born: Theodore Arcidi; June 16, 1958 (age 68) Buffalo, New York, U.S.
- Education: Arlington Catholic High School; Norwich University; Tufts University School of Dental Medicine

Professional wrestling career
- Ring name(s): Ted Arcidi, Strongest Man in the World
- Billed height: 5 ft 11 in (180 cm)
- Billed weight: 285 lb (129 kg)
- Billed from: Boston, Massachusetts, U.S.
- Trained by: Tony Altomare
- Debut: December 1985
- Retired: 1990

Theodore (Ted) Arcidi (born June 16, 1958) is an American former professional wrestler, actor, and powerlifter. He is known to be the first man in history to bench press over 700 pounds in competition, establishing an official world record.

== Early life ==
Arcidi was born in Buffalo, New York, and grew up in Concord, Massachusetts. The son of a nurse, Anne Arcidi and orthodontist, Doctor Joseph M. Arcidi. Ted was raised Roman Catholic and attended parochial schools with his 6 siblings, 3 brothers and 3 sisters. Throughout elementary and high school, Ted was active in all sports, particularly Ice hockey. Ted received a BS from Norwich University and went on to Graduate School at Tufts University School of Dental Medicine. While he was obtaining more science credits to get into dental school he taught junior high and high school biology. That was cut short when his power lifting talent was good enough to compete at a world class level.

== Powerlifting/Bench press world record ==
Ted Arcidi bench pressed 705.5 pounds (320 kg) on March 3, 1985 at Gus Rethwisch's Hawaii International Powerlifting Championships in Honolulu, Hawaii for an APF & USPF world record, to become the first man to bench 700 pounds in an officially recognized powerlifting competition. Then, after being 5 1/2 years away from competition due to his wrestling career, he made a comeback. Weighing 291 pounds, Arcidi set another world record with a 718.1 lbs bench press at the APF Bench Press Invitational on September 30, 1990, in Keene, New Hampshire. On September 14, 1991, at a Mr. Olympia contest, he squared off face to face with his greatest rival Anthony Clark to determine who the greatest bench presser of the world was. Arcidi defeated the much bigger Clark (5'8", 375 lbs) by pressing 725 pounds off his chest to establish a new world record, but was disqualified when judges deemed he failed to lock out his elbows.

Arcidi's 705 pound all-time world record bench press was performed in one of the earliest bench shirts - an original pre-prototype supportive bench press shirt, which was 50% polyester and 50% cotton and only one layer thick. It was thus later categorized as "equipped", although it did not improve his bench by much, if anything. It was an equivalent to a modern day Under Armour shirt. In 1984 Arcidi had benched an official 666.9 pounds (302.5 kg) at 286.0 pounds bodyweight completely raw, without a bench shirt, elbow or wrist wraps at the Hawaii International Powerlifting Championships as well. He is considered to be one of the strongest bench pressers of all time.

== Records done in Official Power Lifting Full Meets ==
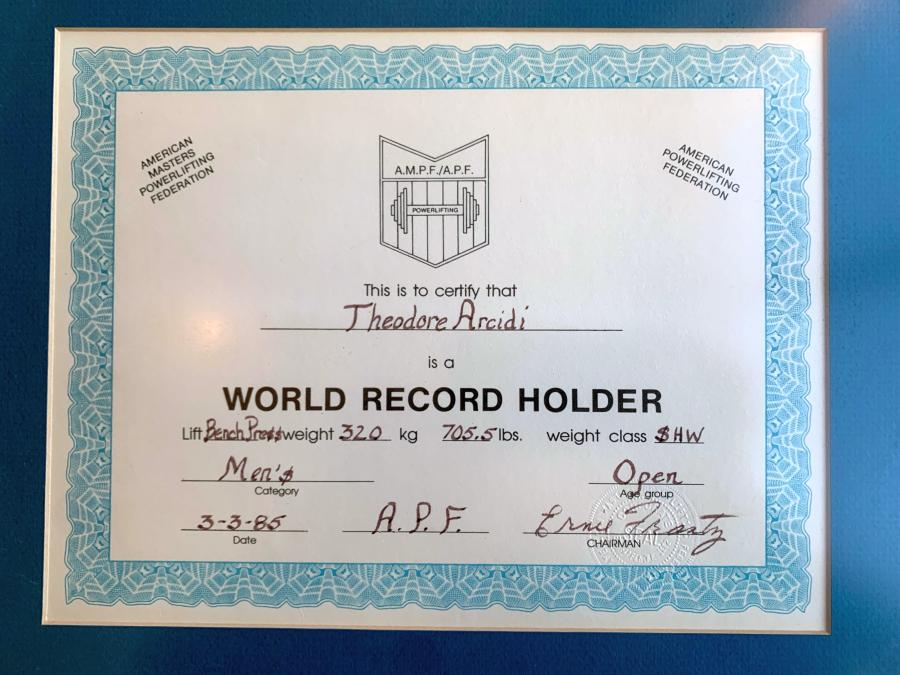
World Record Holder Ted Arcidi

- Raw Bench press:
  - 666.9 lbs (302.5 kg) @308 lb class (286 lb bodyweight) raw without wrist wraps, elbow wraps or a bench shirt (1984 Honolulu, Hawaii)
  - 650.4 lbs (295.0 kg) @275 lb class (275 lb bodyweight) raw without wrist wraps, elbow wraps or a bench shirt (1983 Westminster, Maryland) (NSM)

→ current all time completely raw (unequipped using no wrist wraps, no elbow wraps or a bench shirt) benchpress world records in the 308lb and 275lb class

Done in official bench-only invitational meet:

- Equipped Bench press – 718.1 lbs (325.7 kg) @308 lb class (291 lb bodyweight) in an early single-ply bench shirt (1990 Keene, New Hampshire)

→ former all-time bench press world record regardless of weight class and equipment

== Professional wrestling career ==
Arcidi lifted for several years and eventually was sought by and debuted in Vince McMahon's World Wrestling Federation (WWF) in late 1985. Arcidi faced other "strongmen" such as Tony Atlas, Big John Studd, and Hercules Hernandez during his stint and made a single appearance at WrestleMania 2 in the WWF/NFL Battle Royal. In 1986, he wrestled Big John Studd for the main event at the Boston Garden. He was the first WWF wrestler to hold the moniker of "The World’s Strongest Man". His final match was against Jake Roberts on February 14, 1987 in Calgary, Alberta.

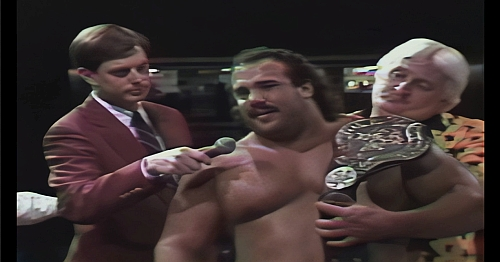
Percy Pringle and Ted Arcidi with the commentator

Arcidi was immortalized as a wrestling doll when WWF brought out a line of Wrestling Superstars toys in 1987.

After his WWF run, he went to Calgary and briefly worked for Stu Hart's Stampede Wrestling, where Arcidi turned heel. After that, Arcidi moved on the World Class Championship Wrestling in Dallas, Texas, where he was known as "Mr. 705" (referring to his world record bench press). He was managed by Percival Pringle III and was part of a stable of wrestlers including Rick Rude, the Dingo Warrior and Cactus Jack Manson. Arcidi captured that organization's Texas Heavyweight Championship on August 31, 1987 and held it until he lost to Matt Borne on November 10 that same year.

== Championships and accomplishments ==
- World Class Wrestling Association

- WCWA Texas Heavyweight Championship (1 time)

== Acting career ==
Arcidi started focusing on his acting career in 1997, with parts in films and shows such as Law & Order, a small part in The Equalizer 2, and in several commercials. He participated in numerous acting classes and casting director workshops on a weekly basis, engaging with both the New York City and Boston markets. During this period, he also seized opportunities to act in various student films and low-budget projects, collaborating with institutions such as Emerson College, Boston University, Boston College, and New York University.

== Filmography ==
The table below comes from IMDb.

Year	Title	Role	Type
2025	The Chair Company	Building Super	TV series
2020	Defending Jacob (miniseries)	Kingston	TV mini series
2020	Ray Donovan	Ricky Ronsen	TV series
2019	Blue Bloods (TV series)	Robbie Gold	TV series
2018	The Equalizer 2	Big Ernie	Movie
2018	The Path	The Super	TV series
2017	Born Guilty	Larry	Movie
2016	Donald Cried	Corey	Movie
2014	The Leftovers	Tow Truck Driver	TV series
2013	The Family	Tommy (Mobster)	Movie
2013	Standing Up	Mr. Falco	Short
2011	The A Plate	Chuck	Movie
2011	Law & Order: Special Victims Unit	Prison Guard #1	TV series
2011	Nurse Jackie	Driver	Movie
2011	30 Rock	Tony	TV series
2010	Smark	Eddie Rocket	Movie
2010	The Fighter	Lou Gold	Movie
2010	The Town	Cedar Junction C.O.	Movie
2010	The Imperialists Are Still Alive!	Don	Movie
2009	Don McKay	Officer Randall	Movie
2008	Lipstick Jungle	Cop	TV series
2005	Commitment	Sully	Short
2005	Losers of the Year	Larry the Cop	Video
2004	Heart of Spider	Jimmy	Short
2000	Prince of Central Park	Construction Worker	Movie
2000	H&G	Cooking show cook	Short
1999	The Good Man's Sin	George	Short
1998	Law & Order	Landlord	TV series
1998	Bobby Loves Mangos	Mr. Coine	Short
1987	Jake the Snake Roberts	Ted Arcidi	Video

== Business ventures ==
After leaving Pro-Wrestling, Ted created a vitamin supplement company called Arcidi Strength Systems. Among these are his ownership of New England's largest women's gym in Manchester, New Hampshire, and a gym equipment company called Weightlifters Warehouse. Later, Arcidi bought the building with his father. Ted purchased Ryefield Farm, a 125-acre corn and hay farm located near Route 101A in Milford, NH.

== See also ==
- Progression of the bench press world record
- Anthony Clark
- Big James Henderson
- Jim Williams
- Shear'Ree
