= Progression of the bench press world record =

Bench press world records are the international records in bench press across the years, regardless of weight class or governing organization, for bench pressing on the back without using a bridge technique.

The advent of bench press shirts, which support the lifter's shoulders and provide upward force, have increased records significantly since 1985. As of 2023, the world record bench press without any equipment ("raw") was set by American Julius Maddox at 355 kg (782.6 lb), surpassing his previous record of 349 kg (770 lb).

The current world record (equipped, with shirt) is held by American Jimmy Kolb established on July 29th, 2023, at the 2023 IPA Tristar Bash meet, when he successfully locked out 635 kg (1,401 lb), beating the previous record by 23 kg (51 lb).

The women's equipped bench press record belongs to Ashleigh Hoeta, from New Zealand, who lifted 317.5 kilograms (700 lb) (2023, IPL standards), and the raw bench press record belongs to April Mathis from the United States, who lifted 207.5 kg (457.4 lb) (2016, Southern Powerlifting Federation standards).

== Before 1973 ==
Weight	Year	Record	Gear
164 kg (362 lb)	1898	Georg Hackenschmidt presses 164 kg (362 lb) from the floor.	unassisted
165 kg (364 lb)	1916	Joe Nordquest presses 165 kg (364 lb) from the floor.	unassisted
181kg (400 lb)	1950	Doug Hepburn becomes the first man to bench press 400.	unassisted
204kg (450 lb)	1951	Doug Hepburn becomes the first man to bench press 450.	unassisted
227 kg (500 lb)	1953	Doug Hepburn becomes the first man to bench press 400, 450, and 500 lb. In November 1950 he pressed 400 lb (181 kg). He pressed 450 lb (204 kg) in 1951, and 500 lb (227 kg) on May 28, 1953.	unassisted
263 kg (580 lb)	1953	Doug Hepburn presses 263 kg (580 lb) in training, using a "collar to collar" grip and a slight bounce on the chest.	unassisted
250 kg (550 lb)	1957	Doug Hepburn presses 250 kg (550 lb) in Portland, Oregon. He would follow this lift with an unsuccessful attempt at 272.5 kg (600 lb) that resulted in a severe shoulder injury.	unassisted
281 kg (619 lb)	1957	Paul Anderson presses 281 kg (620 lb) unofficially.	unassisted
256 kg (565 lb)	1959	Bruno Sammartino presses 256 kg (565 lb).	unassisted
279 kg (615.5 lb)	1967	Pat Casey presses 279 kg (615.5 lb) on March 25, 1967, and becomes the first man to bench press over 600 lb officially.	unassisted
288 kg (635 lb)	1971	Jim Williams presses 288 kg (635 lb) at the Eastern USA Open. Then in November, he presses 300 kg (661 lb).	raw
306 kg (675 lb)	1972	Jim Williams presses 306 kg (675 lb) with only ace bandages on his elbows, wearing a T-shirt on November 9, at the 1972 AAU World Powerlifting Championships. Williams' best performance in the bench press was 326.5 kg (720 lbs) unofficially.	raw

== Foundation of the IPF ==
With the foundation of the International Powerlifting Federation (IPF), the federation began keeping "official" powerlifting world records as the international governing body for the sport of powerlifting. Previous records which hadn't been set within the newly established rules, were reset (for example, elbow bandages had been allowed prior to the formation of the IPF, but were later outlawed). These are the official bench press records after the IPF-reset until they surpass the previously set mark of 306 kg (675 lb) by Jim Williams.

Weight	Year	Record	Gear
263 kg (580 lb)	1973	Don Reinhoudt presses 263 kg (580 lb) raw at the inaugural IPF World Powerlifting Championships in Harrisburg, Pennsylvania on November 10, 1973.	unnassisted
267.5 kg (590 lb)	1974	Don Reinhoudt presses 267.5 kg (590 lb) raw with a belt at the AAU Senior National Championships in Fort Worth, Texas on September 1, 1974.	raw
275.5 kg (607 lb)	1975	Don Reinhoudt presses 275.5 kg (607 lb) raw on May 3, 1975, in Chattanooga using a belt and wrist wraps.	raw
276.5 kg (610 lb)	1977	Wayne Bouvier presses 276.5 kg (610 lb) in August, 1977.	raw
277.5 kg (612 lb)	1978	Doug Young presses 277.5 kg (612 lb) on April 3, 1978, in El Dorado, Arkansas.	raw
278 kg (613 lb)	1979	Lars Hedlund presses 278 kg (613 lb) on June 21, 1979, in Stockholm.	raw
280 kg (620 lb)	1979	Bill Kazmaier presses 280 kg (617 lb) on July 8 at the USPF Nationals in Bay St. Louis, Mississippi and then breaks his own record with 282.5 kg (623 lb) on November 4, 1979, in Dayton, Ohio at the IPF Men's World Powerlifting Championships.	raw
285 kg (628 lb)	1980	Lars Hedlund presses 285 kg (628 lb) on March 4, 1980, Copenhagen.	raw
287.5 kg (634 lb)	1980	Bill Kazmaier presses 287.5 kg (634 lb) despite quadriceps injury at the 1980 World Series of Powerlifting in May 1980 in Auburn, Alabama.	raw
300 kg (661 lb)	1981	Bill Kazmaier first presses 290 kg (639 lb) and then 300 kg (661 lb) at the USPF West Georgia Open Powerlifting Championships, held in Columbus, Georgia on January 31, 1981, to become the first human to officially bench press 300 kg (661 lb) (raw) in an IPF-sanctioned meet (and without elbow wraps).	raw
302.5 kg (667 lb)	1984	Ted Arcidi presses 302.5 kg (667 lb) without wrist wraps on April 1, 1984, in Honolulu, Hawaii at the Hawaiian Internationals at only 286 lb (130 kg) bodyweight.	raw

=== Equipped (with bench shirt) ===
Weight	Year	Record	Gear
320 kg (705 lb)	1985	Ted Arcidi first presses 307.5 kg (678 lb) and then becomes the first man to bench press over 700 lb with a lift of 705.75 lb (320 kg), performed without wrist wraps, but with one of the first prototype supportive bench press shirts, which was 50% polyester and 50% cotton and only one layer thick.	shirt
326 kg (718 lb)	1990	Ted Arcidi presses 326 kg (718 lb) at the APF Bench Press Invitational on September 30 in Keene, New Hampshire.	shirt
329 kg (725 lb)	1993	Anthony Clark presses 329 kg (725 lb) in May and then on September 25, breaks his own record with a 333.5 kg (735 lb) lift at the USPF Northwest Open.	shirt
335 kg (738 lb)	1994	Anthony Clark presses 335 kg (738 lb).	shirt
335.5 kg (740 lb)	1995	Jamie Harris presses 335.5 kg (740 lb) at the APF State Championships in March 1995.	shirt
336 kg (741 lb)	1995	Chris Confessore presses 336 kg (741 lb) at only 236 lb (107 kg) bodyweight on June 17, 1995.	shirt
340 kg (750 lb)	1995	Anthony Clark presses 339 kg (748 lb) and 340 kg (750 lb) at the Great Bench Press of America Meet in Texas.	shirt
349 kg (770 lb)	1996	Anthony Clark presses 349 kg (770 lb) and later 354 kg (780 lb) in September 1996 at the Mr. Olympia.	shirt
356 kg (785 lb)	1997	Anthony Clark presses 356 kg (785 lb).	shirt
364 kg (802 lb)	1999	Tim Isaac is the first man to bench press over 800 lb* with a lift of 802 lb (364 kg) on July 24 in Phoenix, Arizona.	shirt
408 kg (900 lb)	2003	Gene Rychlak is the first man to bench press 900 lb (408 kg).	shirt
455 kg (1,004 lb)	2004	Gene Rychlak is the first man to bench press over 1,000 lb with a lift of 1,004 lb (455 kg) in November.	shirt
457 kg (1,008 lb)	2006	Scot Mendelson presses 457 kg (1,008 lb) (February 18) in a powerlifting exhibition called Fit Expo in Pasadena, California.	shirt
458 kg (1,010 lb)	2006	Gene Rychlak presses 458 kg (1,010 lb) (December 16).	shirt
470 kg (1,036 lb)	2007	Ryan Kennelly presses 470 kg (1,036 lb) (September 22–23).	shirt
476 kg (1,050 lb)	2007	Ryan Kennelly presses 476 kg (1,050 lb) on December 1, at the APA Northwest Open in Kennewick, Washington.	shirt
485 kg (1,070 lb)	2008	Ryan Kennelly presses 485 kg (1,070 lb) on April 12, at the APA Northwest Iron War in Kennewick, Washington.	shirt
487 kg (1,074 lb)	2008	Ryan Kennelly presses 487 kg (1,074 lb) (July 13).	shirt
487.5 kg (1,075 lb)	2008	Ryan Kennelly presses 487.5 kg (1,075 lb) on November 8, at the Pride Strength Wars in Kennewick, Washington.	shirt
488.5 kg (1,077 lb)	2013	Tiny Meeker presses 488.5 kg (1,077 lb) on April 13, at the SPF Texas State Powerlifting Championship.	shirt
500 kg (1,102 lb)	2013	Tiny Meeker presses 500 kg (1,102 lb) at the Cajun Hardcore Powerlifting Meet, December 14 in Buena, Texas.	shirt
501 kg (1,105 lb)	2020	Will Barotti presses 501 kg (1,105 lb) on June 20 at the Metal Militia Power Wars.	shirt
503.5 kg (1,110 lb)	2020	Will Barotti presses 503.5 kg (1,110 lb) on December 12 at the Metal Militia World Championships.	shirt
508 kg (1,120 lb)	2021	Jimmy Kolb presses 508 kg (1,120 lb) on June 27 at the IPA Strength Spectacular Powerlifting Championships.	shirt
510 kg (1,125 lb)	2021	Tiny Meeker presses 510 kg (1,125 lb) on November 20 at the IPA Nationals Powerlifting Championships.	shirt
512.5 kg (1,130 lb)	2022	Bill Gillespie presses 512.5 kg (1,130 lb) on January 22 at the 365Strong New Year Power Bash.	shirt
599 kg (1,320 lb)	2022	Jimmy Kolb presses 599 kg (1,320 lb) on February 27 at the 2022 IPA Pennsylvania State Powerlifting Championships.	shirt
612 kg (1,350 lb)	2023	Jimmy Kolb presses 612.5 kg (1,350 lb) on February 4 at the IPA Hillbilly Havoc meet.	shirt
635 kg (1,401 lb)	2023	Jimmy Kolb presses 635.4 kg (1,401 lb) on July 29 at the 2023 IPA Tri-Star Bash in Elizabethton, TN.	shirt
659 kg (1,453 lb)	2025	Jimmy Kolb presses 659 kg (1,453 lb) on June 7 at the Sonny Comly 3rd Annual Memorial Meet in Pennsylvania, USA.	shirt

* note: Anthony Clark performed a controversial 800-pound bench press at the Arnold Classic in 1997, 2 years before Tim Isaac. This lift was, however, later turned down.

=== Unequipped (without bench shirt) ===
For the bench press to be considered raw, no bench shirts are allowed; however, wrist wraps, singlets and belts are allowed. Elbow bandages had been allowed prior to the formation of the IPF, but were later outlawed.

Weight	Year	Record	Gear
320 kg (705 lb)	1996	James Henderson presses 320 kg (705 lb) raw in a T-shirt without wrist wraps or a belt to become the second man to bench press over 700 lb raw (and the first to have done so in official competition), in May 1996.	unnassisted
322.5 kg (711 lb)	1997	James Henderson first presses 700 lb (317.5 kg) and on a later attempt the same day 711 lb (322.5 kg) raw without wrist wraps or a belt on July 13, 1997, at the USPF Senior Nationals in Philadelphia, Pennsylvania (full three-lift-meet). Today, it is still the highest bench press ever performed in a drug-tested competition, the highest ever done in an IPF-sanctioned three-lift-meet, and the highest unassisted bench press in history.	unnassisted
323 kg (713 lb)	2003	Scot Mendelson presses 713 lb (323 kg) on February 8, 2003.	raw
324 kg (715 lb)	2005	Scot Mendelson presses 715 lb (324 kg) with belt and wrist wraps on May 22, 2005, in Worcester, Massachusetts at the New England Bench Press Classic.	raw
325 kg (716 lb)	2013	Eric Spoto first presses 325 kg (716 lb) and then 327.5 kg (722 lb) with belt and wrist wraps on May 19, 2013, at the 2013 SPF California State Powerlifting Meet in Sacramento, California. Eric successfully benched 661 lb on his 1st, 716 lb on his 2nd and 722 lb on his 3rd attempt on the same day.	raw
335 kg (739 lb)	2015	Kirill Sarychev presses 335 kg (739 lb) with wrist wraps and without a belt on November 22, 2015, at the SN-Pro Cup.	raw
335.5 kg (740 lb)	2019	Julius Maddox presses 335.5 kg (740 lb) with wrist wraps and without a belt on August 31, 2019, at the Boss of Bosses 6.	raw
337.5 kg (744 lb)	2019	Julius Maddox presses 337.5 kg (744 lb) with wrist wraps and without a belt on November 17, 2019, at the Rob Hall Classic.	raw
349 kg (770 lb)	2020	Julius Maddox presses 349 kg (770 lb) with wrist wraps and without a belt on March 7, 2020, at the XPC Powerlifting Coalition.	raw
355 kg (783 lb)	2021	Julius Maddox presses 355 kg (783 lb) with wrist wraps and without a belt on February 21, 2021, at the Ghost Strong Hybrid Showdown.	raw

== IPC powerlifting ==
International Paralympic Committee regulates unequipped paralympic powerlifting competition without wrist wraps or belt.

Weight	Year	Record	Gear
291 kg (642 lb)	2011	Siamand Rahman presses 291 kg (642 lb) (December 4, 2011)	raw
295 kg (650 lb)	2015	Siamand Rahman presses 295 kg (650 lb) on July 30, 2015, at the 2015 IPC Powerlifting Asian Open Championships in Almaty, Kazakhstan	raw
310 kg (683 lb)	2016	Siamand Rahman presses 310 kg (683 lb) on September 14, 2016, at the 2016 Paralympic Games in Rio de Janeiro, Brazil.	raw

== See also ==
- Squat world records
- Deadlift world records
- Progression of the deadlift world record
- Paralympic bench press world records
- NFL Scouting Combine bench press records
