= Stan Efferding =

American bodybuilder (born 1967)

- Born: November 6, 1967 (age 58); Portland, Oregon, United States
- Occupations: bodybuilding, powerlifting
- Height: 6 ft 0 in (1.83 m)

Stan "The White Rhino" Efferding (born November 6, 1967) is an American IFBB professional bodybuilder and a powerlifter competing in the Southern Powerlifting Federation (SPF). He held the all-time raw world powerlifting records in the 275-pound-class in the Total without knee wraps (w/o 2,226.6 lbs) and in the Squat without knee wraps (854 lbs). Due to his enormous physical strength, regularly competing in professional powerlifting contests along his career in professional competitive bodybuilding, Efferding is often referred to as the "world's strongest bodybuilder".

== Bodybuilding & Powerlifting career ==
Stan Efferding, born November 6, 1967, in Portland, Oregon, graduated from University of Oregon. He had a college scholarship to play soccer, but he decided to go to University of Oregon, where he studied Psychology.

Efferding competed in bodybuilding since 1988 winning the Mr. Oregon in 1991, placing 6th in the Jr. USA in 1992 and placing 2nd in the Emerald Cup in 1996 and 1997. Efferding started competing in powerlifting in 1996 in the Pepsi Region 8 challenge, deadlifting 782 lbs and totalling over 2000 lbs (907 kg) in single ply equipment.

In 1997 Efferding stopped competing in both sports in order to pursue business opportunities, but continued lifting.

At the age of 38, Efferding came back to bodybuilding and competed in the 2006 Seattle Emerald Cup, winning the Superheavyweight class weighing 235 lbs. In 2008, he came back and won the Emerald Cup Heavyweight class and overall award. In February 2009 at the age of 41 Efferding totaled 2,070 lbs at the APA "All RAW" Northwest Regional Championships in the non drug-tested category (shown in the results list as "NT"), setting 2 American records in the open category.

Efferding earned his IFBB Pro Card on July 17, 2009, winning the Superheavyweight class and overall award at the Masters Nationals Bodybuilding Championships weighing 259 lbs.

On September 19, 2009, Efferding competed at the Southern Powerlifting Federation (SPF) POWER "Stimulus Package" Raw Meet in Sacramento, California, and totaled 2,221.2 lbs in the 275 lbs category - just 38 lbs away from all-time raw world record, set in 1972 by Jon Cole. His lifts were an 821 lb squat, a 606.3 lb bench press (earning him a place on the 600 Pound Unequipped Bench Press Hall of Fame), and a 794 lb deadlift.

In 2010 Efferding won the title "Mr. Olympia 2010 World's Strongest Professional Bodybuilder" by benching 628 lbs and deadlifting 800 lbs for a 1,428 lb push/pull total. This set a new record for the world's strongest bodybuilder and beat the previous title holders (Johnnie O. Jackson) record by nearly 100 pounds.

On May 15, 2011, Stan entered the 2011 SPF California State Championships and competed raw without knee wraps. He set two all-time world records, squatting 854 lbs and a three lift total of 2,226.6 lbs beating the former world record holder, Konstantin Konstantinovs of Latvia, by over 50 lbs.

On March 24, 2013, Efferding broke the old raw Total record in the 275-pound-class held by Jon Cole since 1972: At the event called supertrainng.tv "March Madness" Efferding set the record to 2,303 lbs with an 865.2 lbs squat, a 600.7 lbs bench press and an 837.5 lbs deadlift.

Efferding is the creator of the Vertical Diet.

== Contest history ==
- 2008 NPC Emerald Cup Heavyweight and overall 1st
- 2009 NPC Masters, Teen & Collegiate National Championship Superheavyweight and Overall 1st
- 2010 IFBB Phoenix Pro - 16th
- 2010 IFBB Orlando Europa Pro - 14th
- 2010 Mr. Olympia Worlds Strongest Pro Bodybuilder - 1st
- 2011 IFBB Flex Pro - 9th
- 2012 IFBB Flex Pro - 13th

== Personal Powerlifting Records ==
done in official competition

- Raw Squat no knee wraps - 854.2 lbs (387.5 kg) (SPF May, 2011)
- Raw Squat with knee wraps - 865.2 lbs (392.5 kg) (SPF March 24, 2013 "March Madness")
- Raw Bench press - 606.3 lbs (275 kg) (SPF September 2009)
- Raw Deadlift - 837.5 lbs (380 kg) (SPF March 24, 2013 "March Madness")
- Equipped Deadlift - 825 lbs (374.21 kg) (Pride March, 2008)
- Equipped Deadlift - 881 lbs (400 kg) (Gym lift, 2013)
- Raw Total no knee wraps - 2,226.6 lbs (1,007.52 kg) (SPF May, 2011)
- Raw Total with knee wraps - 2,303 lbs (1,042 kg) (SPF March 24, 2013 "March Madness")

→ current all-time raw (unequipped) powerlifting total world records in the 275lb class (formerly held by Jon Cole)

done in gym

- Raw Squat with knee wraps - 905 lbs (410.5 kg)

== See also ==
- Jon Cole
- Konstantin Konstantinovs
- Mark Bell
- Eric Spoto
- Dan Green
