= Shear'Ree =

First man to bench press 700 lbs

- Born: Ohio, United States
- Occupations: Powerlifter, Coach, Politician

Shear'Ree is a powerlifter from California who is reported by some, on November 15, 1982, as the first man to bench press 700 pounds raw (without the usage of any aids).

== Background ==
Even though James Henderson is credited as the first man to officially bench press 700 pounds raw in 1996 if the sources are correct, this makes Shear'Ree to have achieved this feat 14 years prior. His bench press of 700.9 pounds without the use of specialized equipment, such as lifting suits or bench shirts, is said to have been the first successful attempt of its kind and has been recognized by some as a significant milestone in the sport of powerlifting nonetheless.

Shear’Ree trained extensively for several years leading up to the Venice Open, where he benched a personal best of 474 lbs while equipped. He prepared by gradually increasing the weight he lifted. with the help of his spotter, Ed McGlasson. Following his achievement, Shear’Ree became a coach and mentor to many aspiring powerlifters, including McGlasson.

As a coach, Shear’Ree trained and mentored the first female firefighters in California who passed the Los Angeles City Fire Department physical aptitude test. He also used his achievement to support various humanitarian causes, including restoring vandalized headstones at Mt. Carmel Cemetery and raising money for victims of the San Ysidro McDonald's massacre by hosting a Lift-A-Thon. Shear’Ree started his own outreach program called Program Shear’Ree and spoke to schools and troubled youths in gangs.

In addition to his achievements in powerlifting and coaching, Shear’Ree had a career in politics. He ran for President in the 1996 election and is registered as a candidate for the 2024 elections. Shear’Ree also founded Shear’Ree Motorsports and created the Shear’Ree Edition Muscle Truck heavy Chevy, of which only 800 were made. He was interviewed after lane splitting became legal for motorbike riders in California and worked with the Highway Patrol to test the safety and functionality of the maneuver.

== Presidential campaigns ==
Shear'Ree briefly ran for President of the United States in 1996 as a Republican. He was registered as a candidate for the 2024 United States presidential election as an independent under the name Shear'Ree Shear'Ree.
