= Doug Hepburn =

Canadian strongman and weightlifter

Personal information
- Born: Douglas Ivan Hepburn; September 16, 1926 Vancouver, British Columbia, Canada
- Died: November 22, 2000 (aged 74)
- Occupation(s): strongman, Olympic weightlifting, professional wrestling,
- Height: 5 ft 8 1/2 in (1.74 m)
- Weight: 300 lb (136 kg) active
Medal record
Representing Canada
Men's Weightlifting
World Weightlifting Championships
Gold medal – first place	1953 Stockholm	+90 kg
British Empire Games
Gold medal – first place	1954 Vancouver	+90 kg

Douglas Ivan Hepburn (September 16, 1926 – November 22, 2000) was a Canadian strongman and weightlifter. He won weightlifting gold medals in the 1953 World Weightlifting Championships as well as the 1954 British Empire Games in the heavyweight division. He is also known as the first man to bench press 400, 450, 500, and 550 pounds (raw). During the 1950s he was publicly known as the "world's strongest man" for his many feats of strength. Hepburn has been inducted into the Canadian Olympic Hall of Fame (1953), Canada's Sports Hall of Fame (1955), and the B.C. Sports Hall of Fame (1966).

== Early life ==
Born in Vancouver with a deformity to his right foot (club foot) and a vision distortion called esotropia (cross-eyes), Hepburn had to go through surgery multiple times during his childhood. He began lifting weights as a high school teenager at the Vancouver YMCA, and upon dropping out of school, tried to find work that he could balance with his lifting. Having escaped the Second World War because of his foot, he set about becoming the strongest man in the world.

== Career ==
=== Weightlifting ===
Hepburn entered competition in 1948, and set an unofficial Canadian record (300 lbs. clean & press) at his first competition. He took the U.S. Open title in 1947, by pressing 345 lbs. Hepburn set another Canadian weightlifting record in 1950 and went on to win a gold medal at the 1953 World Weightlifting Championships in Stockholm with a 1030 lbs Olympic 3-lift-total. After years of trying to attract public interest, the win in Stockholm had finally catapulted him into the media spotlight. During his preparations for the 1954 British Empire Games in his hometown of Vancouver, the whole city got behind him, and he was given $150 a week while training in a gym by then-mayor Fred Hume. At the Games, Hepburn would claim another weightlifting gold medal in the heavyweight division by lifting a total of 1040 lbs (370 lbs press - 300 lbs snatch - 370 lbs clean & jerk) to set a new Games record becoming a Canadian national hero. He was awarded the Lou Marsh Trophy in 1953 and was named British Columbia's Man of the Year for 1954.

==== Personal weightlifting records ====
(Done in the no-contact style)

- Clean and press – 381 lbs
- Snatch – 300 lbs
- Clean and jerk – 383 lbs

→ Prior to 1964 no contact between the bar and the athlete's body was permitted during the pulling phase of either the snatch or the clean. From 1964 to 1968 a "thigh brush" was allowed, and from 1969 onwards a full-contact hip bump was permitted to assist in completing the lift.

=== Strongman and Powerlifting ===
While training for the weightlifting championships, Hepburn performed as a strongman at two to three shows a week across Canada, ripping license plates, crushing cans of oil, and lifting weights with his baby finger, as well as more traditional lifting: shoulder presses, squats, bench presses, two-handed curls. Some of Hepburn's career best lifts include:

- Clean and Press – 381 pounds (173 kg)
- Press off the Rack – 450 pounds (204.5 kg)
- Push Press off the Rack – 500 pounds (227 kg)
- One-Arm Military Press – 200 pounds (91 kg), and 37 reps with 120 pounds (54.5 kg)
- Two-Hand Barbell Curl – 260 pounds (118 kg)
- Bench Press – 580 pounds (263.5 kg)
- Squat – 800 pounds (363 kg)
- Deadlift – 800 pounds (363 kg)
- Crucifix – 110-pound (50 kg) dumbbells in each hand
- One-Arm Side Hold-Out – 120 pounds (54.5 kg)
- One-Arm Side Press – 250 pounds (113.5 kg)

Hepburn also became the first man in history to bench press 400, 450, 500, and 550 pounds. He set a series of bench press world records in the early 1950s: In November 1950 he pressed 400 lbs (181.82 kg), in 1951 he pressed 450 lbs (204.55 kg), and finally 500 lbs (227.27 kg) in December 1953.

He is also the first man in history to squat 600 pounds, which he achieved in 1951.

Like his father and stepfather, Hepburn battled with alcoholism and consequently experienced depression. After his triumphs in the early 1950s, he became a professional wrestler for a brief period of time.

=== Wrestling ===
After his successes as a weightlifter, he became a professional wrestler. He was originally approached by San Francisco-based wrestling promoter Joe Malcewicz, but Hepburn turned down the offer. He later got involved in the business when he agreed to perform feats of strength at wrestling events promoted by Whipper Billy Watson and Toronto promoter Frank Tunney.

In December 1954, he signed what was announced as a five-year contract with Tunney. After being trained by Watson and Pat Fraley, Hepburn defeated Frank Marconi in his debut match on March 27, 1955. He later wrestled Yukon Eric and Fritz Von Erich and partnered with Antonino Rocca and Watson. Hepburn quit working for Tunney in 1956; he had one more brief stint as a wrestler while working for Cliff Parker in British Columbia before retiring.

== Personal life ==
Hepburn was a singer and songwriter, releasing a Christmas tune, the "Hepburn Carol". He had literary ambitions and had a large output of essays and poems and other writings. At the age of 37, Hepburn opened his own gym. In his later years, he custom built gym equipment and marketed protein powder and other sports supplements. Hepburn suffered from alcoholism and was concerned about his health so became a vegetarian in the mid-1970s. He died of a perforated ulcer at age 74.
