= Scot Mendelson =

American armwrestler and powerlifter (born 1969)

Personal information
- Nickname: "Mendy"
- Nationality: American
- Born: Scot Mendelson; February 21, 1969 (age 57)
- Occupations: Powerlifting, Personal trainer
- Employer: Self-employed
- Height: 5 ft 11 in (1.80 m)
- Weight: 270 - 360 lb (122 - 163kg) active

Competition record

Powerlifting - Bench Press

Representing United States

WPC World Bench Press Championships
1st	2000	140kg
1st	2001	140kg
1st	2008	+140kg

WPO World Record Bench Bash
1st	2002	+140kg

WPO Bench Bash For Cash
1st	2002	+140kg

World Power Stars International Meet
2nd	2007	UNL

World Power Stars
2nd	2007	+140kg

Scot Mendelson (born February 21, 1969) is an American powerlifter and armwrestler who specializes in the bench press.

During his career he set 64 world records predominantly in bench pressing and was the raw (unassisted) world record holder in the 308-pound weight class with 701 lb (318.0 kg) from 2002 to 2020 and the equipped world record holder in the 275-pound class with 1,031 lb (467.7 kg) from 2009 to 2021. He also held the all-time world record in the raw bench press, regardless of weight class with 715 lb (324.3 kg) for 8 years.

He holds world record of both raw and equipped (multi-ply), and is frequently cited in historical record of being a record breaking bench pressers.

== Early life ==
Mendelson is Jewish, and grew up in Brooklyn, New York. His maternal grandfather Morris Reif, known as the "Bronxville Bomber" was Rocky Marciano's stable mate and scored 75 knockouts in 115 fights. In his youth Mendelson loved sports and played baseball and American football. Starting strength training when he reached his teens, he moved into the sport of wrestling and boxing, where he first recognized his rapid growth in strength. Then he moved into bodybuilding. With his pure strength showing even more through his bodybuilding training, Mendelson decided to become a powerlifter.

== Powerlifting career ==
Mendelson started as a raw benchpresser and in 2000, benched 545.6 lb (247.5 kg) raw at APF California State & LALC Invitational. He then moved into equipped division in multi-ply category and benched 600 lb (272.2 kg) during the same year in APF Los Angeles Lifting Club competition.

During 2001 APF Senior Nationals, Mendelson benched 650.3 lb (295.0 kg) in multi-ply and in the same year at WPC World Championships in South Africa bettered it to 738.5 lb (335.0 kg). By the end of 2002, he took his equipped PR to 782.6 lb (355.0 kg).

In 2002 APF Northern California Open Championships in San Francisco, Mendelson bench pressed 701 lb (318.0 kg) raw becoming the second person in history after James Henderson to bench press 700 lb raw. It was also the all-time world record for the 308 lb (heavyweight) class.

=== Raw world record ===
In 2003 APF West Coast Push-Pull championships @ Starks Gym The Live Free or Die Family in San Carlos, Mendelson broke Henderson's five-year old 711 lb (322.5 kg) all-time raw bench press world record regardless of weight classes with 713.2 lb (323.5 kg) with only his 2nd lift.

In 2003 APF Senior Nationals, he took his equipped PR to 821.2 lb (372.5 kg) and then to 825 lb (374.2 kg) during Bench America I competition. However in 2004 Mendelson got disqualified thrice in a row at WPO World Record Bench Bash, Senior Nationals and Iowa State & WPO Qualifier.

In 2005 Atlantis New England Bench Press competition, in front of Ed Coan as the head judge, Mendelson broke his own all-time raw bench press world record with 715 lb (324.3 kg). The record remained unbeaten for another 8 years until Eric Spoto benched 722 lb (327.5 kg) in 2013.

=== Equipped world record ===
At 2005 APF Nationals, Mendelson benched 881.8 lb (400.0 kg) in multi-ply, becoming only the third man in history after Tim Isaac and Gene Rychlak to achieve this feat.

In 2006 Iron Man Bodybuilding contest's Fit Expo in Pasadena, Mendelson broke Rychlak's 1,005 lb (455.9 kg) all-time equipped bench press world record with 1,008.6 lb (457.5 kg) with only his 1st lift. Even though the record didn't last long with the arrival of 'unlimited' equipment category with the rise of the likes of Ryan Kennelly, Will Barotti, Tiny Meeker, Bill Gillespie and Jimmy Kolb, Mendelson improved his multi-ply PR to 1,025.1 lb (465.0 kg) by 2008 WPC World Championships in West Palm Beach.

Mendelson's lifetime PR came in 2009 APF Holiday Festival of Strength in Camarillo, where he benched 1,030.6 lb (467.5 kg) in multi-ply which stood as the all-time multi-ply world record in the 275-pound weight class until Jimmy Kolb in 2020 as well as the all-time multi-ply world record in Masters (40+) category irrespective of weight class until Tiny Meeker in 2013.

=== Injuries and accidents ===
In 2004, Mendelson was involved in a devastating car accident, that sent him to intensive care for three weeks with a fractured skull, broken ribs, broken leg and a right foot held on only by the skin. After a dozen surgeries, his right ankle was finally removed and he was left with one leg about 2 ½ inches shorter than the other. He was also left with an addiction to Vicodin. The ankle injury was also the main reason why he was unable to compete in the other powerlifting disciplines the squat and the deadlift.

In 2013 Mendelson notoriously tore his pec while attempting a raw bench press of 716.5 lb (325.0 kg).

After another car accident in 2015 that made Mendelson unable to continue as a top level powerlifter, he started armwrestling in 2016 and has placed high in national level championship and attended the zloty tour 2018.

=== Legacy ===
Mendelson is a three-times National and five-times World Bench press champion and his career 64 world records in powerlifting is only seconded to Ed Coan. He is the only bench presser in the world to hold both the raw and equipped (multi-ply) world records, (Note: Ted Arcidi held raw and equipped (single-ply) world records.) and is widely regarded as one of the greatest bench pressers of all-time.

== Personal records ==
done in official Powerlifting meets

- Raw Bench press – 715 lb (324.3 kg) @SHW class (2005) (Former All-time World Record)

→ Raw Bench press – 701 lb (318.0 kg) @308 lb class (2002) (Former World Record)

- Equipped Bench press (multi-ply) – 1,030.6 lb (467.5 kg) @275 lb class (2009)

→ Equipped Bench press (multi-ply) – 1,008.6 lb (457.5 kg) @SHW class (2006) (Former All-time World Record)

done during training according to Scot himself

- Equipped Bench press (unlimited) – 1,201 lb (544.8 kg)
- Raw Bench Press – 650 lb (294.8 kg) for 8 repetitions
- Squat – 900 lb (408.2 kg) (not to parallel depth)
- Deadlift – 880 lb (399.2 kg)

== Personal life ==
Mendelson is divorced (2008) to his ex-wife, Maricelle, herself a world champion Powerlifter, Kung Fu practitioner and a martial arts champion. They have three children, two girls and a boy.

Mendelson runs his own 6,000-sq. ft. private personal training gym in Sherman Oaks called "Fitness Individualized Training" (F.I.T.), which teaches strength training and combat sports. Being a supporter for the legalization of cannabis for medical purposes since his first car accident, he opened up his own medical marijuana dispensary "Mendica", together with his friend Eric Roberts in 2009, which goes under the tagline 'one-stop shop for rehab, rebuilding, relaxation and natural pain medication'.

== See also ==
- Progression of the bench press world record
- Ryan Kennelly
- Gene Rychlak
- Eric Spoto
- James Henderson
- Jim Williams
- Ted Arcidi
- List of powerlifters
