= Big James Henderson =

American powerlifter (born 1965)

James Henderson
- Born: April 9, 1965 (age 61); Roxbury, Massachusetts, United States
- Other names: Big James Henderson, James "Hollywood" Henderson
- Occupations: Powerlifter, Preacher, Motivational speaker
- Height: 6 ft 5 in (1.96 m)
- Spouse: Shelia Henderson
- Website: http://www.bigjameshenderson.com/

Competition record

Powerlifting - Bench Press

Representing United States

IPF Bench Press World Championships
1st	1994	+125kg
1st	1995	+125kg
1st	1996	+125kg
1st	1997	+125kg
1st	1998	+125kg

USPF National Powerlifting Championships
3rd	1996	+125kg

James Gregory Henderson, also known as Big James Henderson and James "Hollywood" Henderson, (born April 9, 1965) is a former American powerlifter who specialized in the bench press. He competed in the International Powerlifting Federation (IPF) and was five times Super Heavyweight World Bench Press Champion. He was the first man to bench press over 700 pounds (317.5 kg) raw. James set several world records throughout his career, including the all-time world record in the raw (unassisted) bench press with 711 lb (323 kg).

== Powerlifting career ==
Henderson won five consecutive bench press world titles from the International Powerlifting Federation in the 1990s:

- 1994 Järvenpää, Finland
- 1995 Frýdek-Místek, Czech Republic
- 1996 Silkeborg, Denmark
- 1997 Leduc, Canada
- 1998 Amberg, Germany

Henderson became the second man to bench press over 700 lb raw in May 1996 when he pressed 705 lb in just a T-shirt and made it on the cover of Powerlifting USA magazine.

=== Personal records ===
Powerlifting competition record:

done in official powerlifting meets

- Bench press - 711.0 lb (322.5 kg) @ 390 lb (SHW) raw without wrist wraps and belt (July 13, 1997 USPF/IPF)

→ former IPF world record in SHW class (+regardless of weight class) for over 7 years; surpassed by Brian Siders's 712.1 lb (323.0 kg) (equipped in singleply bench shirt) in 2004

→ former all-time raw world record in SHW class (+regardless of weight class); surpassed by Scot Mendelson's 713 lbs (323.4 kg) (raw) in 2003

→ current all-time drug-tested raw world record in SHW class (+regardless of weight class) since 1997

Gym record (unofficial):

done in the gym according to James himself

- Bench press - 744 lb (337.5 kg) raw without wrist wraps and belt

=== Heaviest lift ===
James Henderson is the current world record holder for heaviest drug tested raw bench press in history and held the highest raw bench press ever done in a full powerlifting 3-lift-meet (squat-bench press-deadlift) until Thomas Davis in 2021. His record setting lift was 711.0 lbs. (322.5 kg) and was performed on July 13, 1997, in Philadelphia, Pennsylvania as the 3rd attempt at the USPF Senior Nationals (IPF/USPF sanctioned three-lift-event) under strict IPF-conditions. On the same day, he pressed 683 lb (309.8 kg) on the 1st, 699.9 lb (317.5 kg) on the 2nd and even went for 722 lb (327.5 kg) on the 4th, but barely missed it. Henderson bench pressed unequipped in the strictest meaning of the word - without belt, without elbow bandages and even without wrist wraps - in just a T-shirt and a singlet.

== Personal life ==
Henderson is a graduate of Mercer University, where he obtained a bachelor's degree in theology and psychology. He also attended Albany State University, where he played football from 1984 to 1986. His career as an offensive lineman ended when he blew out his knee.

In 1989 Henderson was convicted of drug trafficking and obstruction of justice, and was sentenced to 50 years in prison. He served 3 years at Rivers State Prison before being paroled and later pardoned in 1992. While at Rivers State he began reading the Bible and became a devoted born again Christian. Now Henderson gives motivational speeches to groups such as students, business leaders, and prisoners. He currently tours the Georgia Prison System as a speaker for Heartbound Ministries. During his appearances he tells his story of how he became the bench press champion and performs feats of strength.

== See also ==
- Progression of the bench press world record
- Shear'Ree
- Eric Spoto
- Jim Williams
- Ted Arcidi
