= Gene Rychlak =

American powerlifter (1968–2019)

Eugène Rychlak Jr. (1968 – 26 July 2019) was a powerlifter from the United States, who specialized in the bench press. He was the first man to perform a bench press of over both 900 lb (410 kg) and 1,000 lb (450 kg). He was also the founder of the Revolution Powerlifting Syndicate (RPS) powerlifting federation.

== Career ==
Rychlak's bodyweight was in excess of 345 lb (156 kg). Rychlak previously held the record for the world's heaviest equipped bench press of 1010 lb (457 kg) December 16, 2006 in Lake George, NY. This record is now held by Ryan Kennelly, who has lifted 1075 lbs in the same lift.

At the 2005 Mr. Olympia bodybuilding competition, Rychlak attempted to break his own record by pressing 1015 lb (460 kg). Rychlak was unable to complete the press, and despite having several spotters around him, the weight fell onto his body. Rychlak suffered no serious injuries from the accident.

Rychlak has also squatted 1,005 lb (456 kg) in competition.

== Death ==
Gene Rychlak died on July 26, 2019, due to a heart condition.

== See also ==
- Progression of the bench press world record
- Scot Mendelson
- Ryan Kennelly
