= Anthony Clark (powerlifter) =

Filipino-American power lifter

- Historical photo of Clark
- Born: September 15, 1966; Philippines
- Died: May 22, 2005 (aged 38); Friendswood, Texas, US
- Occupations: powerlifter, strongman, spokesman
- Known for: 800-pound bench press
- Spouse: Mindi Toth (fiancee)
- Website: www.anthonyclark.com (defunct)

Anthony Wayne Clark (September 15, 1966, in Philippines – May 22, 2005, in Friendswood, Texas, U.S.) was an American powerlifter, holder of the world record for the reverse-grip bench press and member of the York Barbell Hall of Fame.

== Powerlifting career ==
By the time Clark was 13, he was lifting 110 lb (50 kg) cement weights. In 1986, Clark became the first teenager to bench press 600 lb (270 kg), and was notable for using a reverse grip on the bar. In 1992, he was the first lifter to bench press 700 lb (320 kg) using the reverse grip. On September 25, 1993, at the U.S. Powerlifting Federation (USPF) Northwest Open, Clark broke his own world record with a 735 lb (333 kg) lift. In May 1993 he had pressed 725 lb (329 kg).

After his record-breaking lift, Clark often referred to himself as the World's Strongest Man, and toured for a time performing feats of strength. On one occasion he pushed a 6,000 lb (2,700 kg) elephant, in a heavy-duty wheelbarrow, across the floor in a strongman competition in Japan. In addition to that, Clark gave motivational speeches, seminars, and one-on-one counseling to motivate kids and prison inmates to improve their lives. Clark also claimed that he stopped using steroids at the age of 22, stating that all they did was to increase his blood pressure. He called his best friend Big Mike.

At the Arnold Schwarzenegger Classic in 1997, he performed a controversial, reverse-gripped 800 pounds (360 kg) bench press, which was later turned down. This was more than 2 years before Tim Isaac would break the 800 lb mark at a sanctioned meet.

== Personal records ==
Powerlifting Competition Records

done in official Powerlifting full meets

- Squat – 499 kg (1100 lbs) (in singleply squat suit)
- Bench press – 365 kg (805 lbs) (in bench shirt)
- Deadlift – 350 kg (771 lbs)
- Total – 1179.34 kg (2600 lbs) equipped

→ former IPF world record in SHW class (+regardless of weight class)

Done in gym

- Push press – 227 kg (500 lb)

== Death ==
Anthony Clark, aged 38, died on May 22, 2005, of a heart attack and subsequent kidney failure and is buried at Forest Park East Cemetery in Webster, Texas.
