= Julius Maddox =

American powerlifter (born 1987)

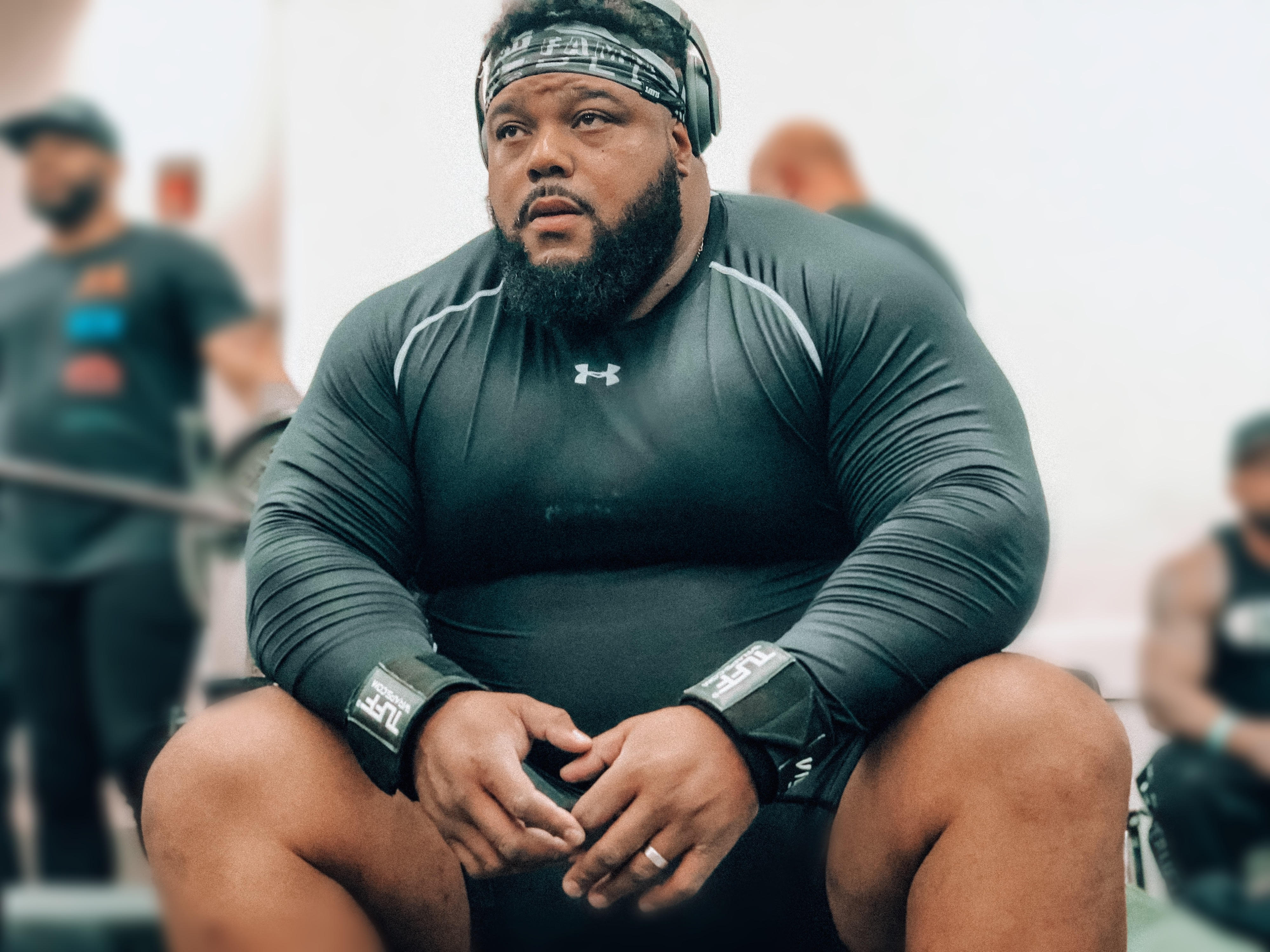
- Maddox in March 2020

Personal information
- Nickname: Irregular Strength
- Nationality: American
- Born: May 13, 1987 (age 39) Owensboro, Kentucky, United States
- Height: 6 ft 3 in (191 cm)
- Weight: 430–447 lb (195–203 kg)
- Website: www.irregularstrength.com

Julius Maddox (born 13 May 1987) is an American powerlifter who is the world record holder in the raw bench press.

== Personal life ==
Maddox was born and raised in Owensboro, Kentucky, where he still lives with his wife Heaven and their four children. In high school, Maddox was recruited for football by several top Division-1 programs, but faced troubles with drug addiction, depression, and jail time. Because of this, Maddox eventually faced a choice between two 5-year prison sentences or entering a recovery program. Maddox entered the recovery program, where he found a set of weights and began his powerlifting journey.

Maddox had been lifting for around seven years at the time he set the world bench press record. Maddox credits lifting weights in helping him overcome his addictions and problems.

Maddox has stated that one of his personal inspirations is C. T. Fletcher. His progressive goal is to bench press 800 lbs (363 kg).

== Records ==
On August 31, 2019, Julius Maddox pressed 739.6 pounds (335.5 kg) with wrist wraps and without a belt, surpassing the 738.5 pounds (335.0 kg) world record of Kirill Sarychev from 2015.

On November 17, 2019, Maddox pressed 744.1 pounds (337.5 kg) with wrist wraps and without a belt, at the Rob Hall Classic meet, breaking his own world record.

In March 2020, Maddox set the world bench press record at 770 pounds (350 kg) at the Arnold Sports Classic in Columbus, Ohio becoming the first man to bench both 750 lb and 350 kg. Maddox also holds the official world record for most times bench pressing 700 pounds (320 kg) in official powerlifting competition, with 10 times.

Maddox competes at anywhere from 440 pounds (200 kg) to 460 pounds (210 kg) bodyweight in recent competition.

On February 21, 2021, Julius broke another All Time World Record at 782 pounds (354.7 kg) at a Ghost Strong meet in Miami Florida.

=== Gym lifts ===
In February 2020 Maddox benched 765 pounds (347 kg) in the gym, sharing it in a post on Instagram. In January 2021, Maddox Benched 771 pounds (350 kg) in the gym, unofficially breaking his own world record by 1 pound (0.45 kg). In May 2021, Maddox benched 795 pounds (361 kg) during a session. His previous best lift in the gym was 755 pounds (342 kg), done in January 2020.

Maddox holds multiple unofficial repetition World Records on the bench press, including 700 pounds (320 kg) for 3 reps, and 640 pounds (290 kg) for 7 reps.

On May 10, 2022, Maddox pressed 796 lbs (361 kg) in his gym, which is 14 lbs above the current world record.

== See also ==
- Progression of the bench press world record
- List of powerlifters
