= Pump and run =

Sporting event

Pump and Run is a sporting event which consists of a strength challenge followed by a race. Typically a bench press event is followed by a 5K running event.

Participants receive a deduction from their overall run time for each repetition of the strength exercise. The person with the lowest adjusted run time wins the event.
