= Bench shirt =

Powerlifting equipment

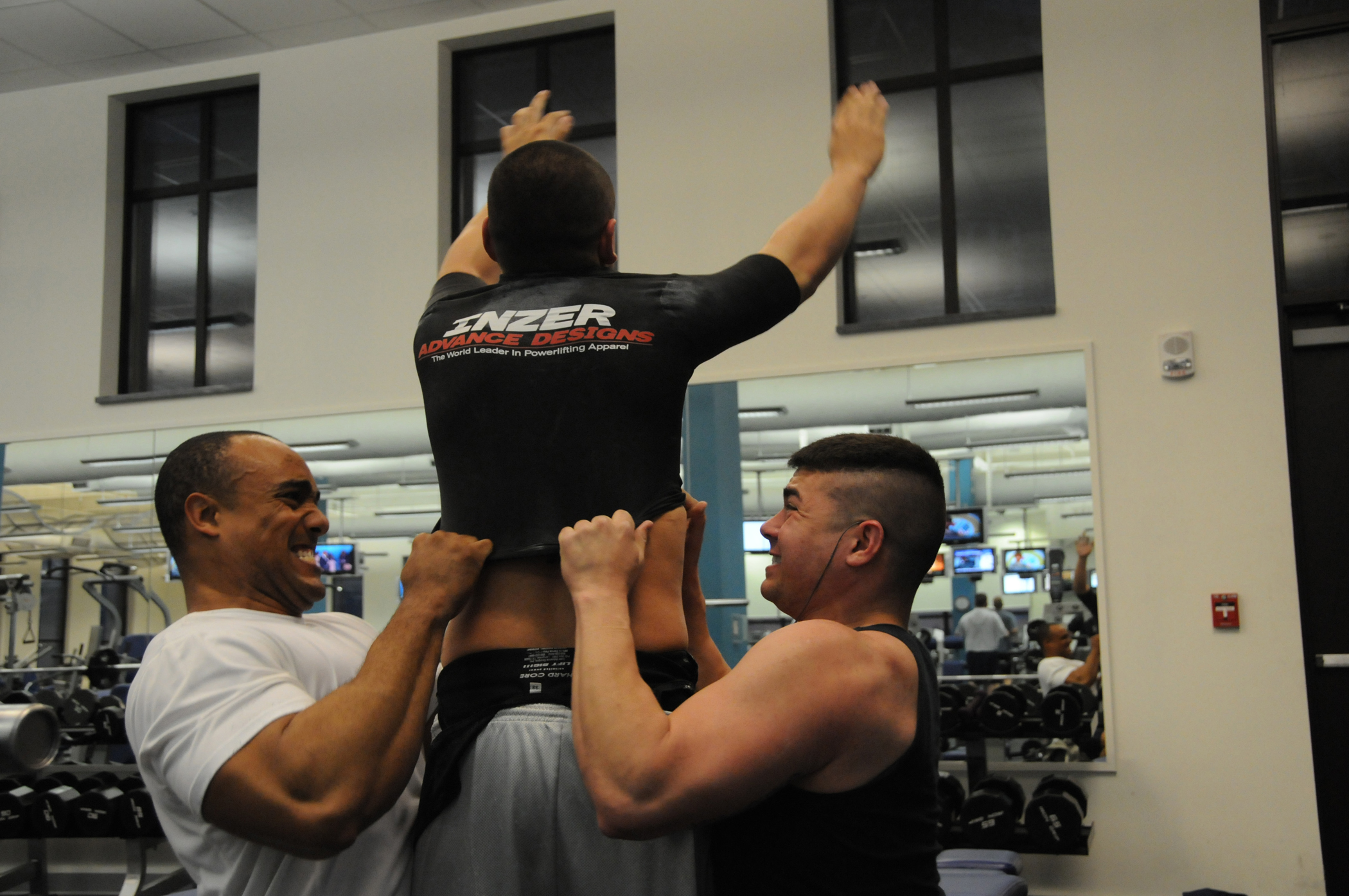
Powerlifters pulling on a bench shirt.

A bench shirt is a stiff, supportive shirt used to improve performance in the bench press, most often in powerlifting competitions. Bench shirts are usually made of polyester, denim, or canvas and come in single- or multi-ply thicknesses. The extremely tight fit of a bench shirt supports the weightlifter's shoulders and deltoid muscles.

Different powerlifting federations have different rules governing allowed equipment—for example, the only supportive equipment allowed by the 100% Raw Powerlifting Federation for bench press is a leather belt, whereas the International Powerlifting Federation stipulates that support shirts must be "of one ply stretch material". As the same lifter's performance may vary significantly depending on the presence and design of a bench shirt (for example, Scot Mendelson has a shirted bench press record of 1030 lbs, while his unshirted best is 715 lbs), records across different federations or categories may not be directly comparable. A bench press performed without the usage of a bench shirt is referred to as a "raw" or "unequipped" lift.
