= Bench press =

Upper body exercise

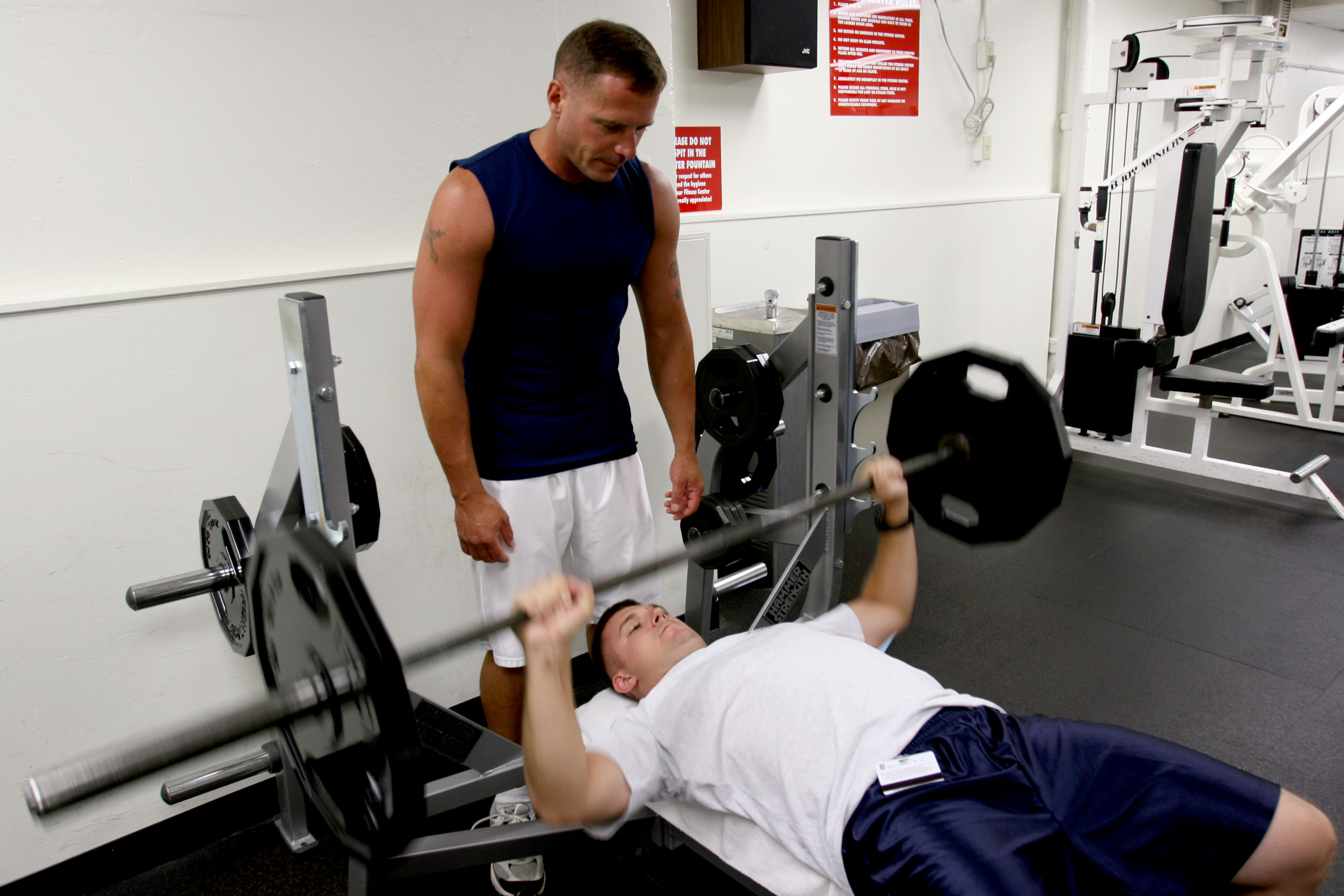
A man performs a barbell bench press while another spots him.

The bench press or chest press is a weight training exercise where a person presses a weight upwards while lying horizontally on a weight training bench. The bench press is a compound movement, with the primary muscles involved being the pectoralis major, the anterior deltoids, and the triceps brachii. Other muscles located in the back, legs and core are involved for stabilization. A barbell is generally used to hold the weight, but a pair of dumbbells can also be used.

The barbell bench press is one of three lifts in the sport of powerlifting alongside the deadlift and the squat, and is the only lift in Paralympic powerlifting. The bench press is also extensively used in weight training, bodybuilding, and other types of training to develop upper body muscles, primarily the pectoralis major. To improve upper body strength, power, and endurance for athletic, occupational, and functional performance as well as muscle development, the barbell bench press is frequently used.

== Movement ==
The person performing the exercise lies on their back on a flat bench with a barbell grasped in both hands directly over their shoulders. Before the bar is lowered, the scapulae are depressed and retracted to ensure stability and protect the shoulder joint. The barbell is lowered to the mid-to-lower sternum until it touches the chest, then pressed back upwards, and the arms are extended until the elbows are locked out. The feet remain flat on the floor throughout the entire movement. This is one repetition.

=== Powerlifting ===
The bench press in powerlifting follows the same basic movement pattern, but with stricter standards. The lifter's head, shoulders and glutes must stay in contact with the bench throughout the lift, and their feet must remain flat on the floor. The bar is lowered to the chest with the referee's signal to start, and remains motionless in contact with the lifter's body until the signal to press is given. An arched back engaging the lower pectoral muscles may be allowed.The lift is finished once the arms are fully extended and the weight is re-racked. The lifter's elbow joints must be level with or below their shoulder joints at the bottom for the lift to count, thereby disallowing reducing the range of motion too much through excessive back arching. These rules can vary across federations.

== History ==
The bench press has evolved over the years, from floor, bridge, and belly toss variations to the methods used by bodybuilders and powerlifters today. It became popular from the late 1950s onwards. Despite the fact the parallel dip is safer (the dip does not require spotters or safety bars), in the 1950s the bench press overtook the dip in popularity and became the standard chest exercise.

At first the strict floor press was the most popular method. In 1899, using a barbell with 48 centimetres (19 in) discs (plates), George Hackenschmidt rolled a barbell over his face (which was turned to the side) and performed a strict floor press with 164 kilograms (362 lb). This stood as a record for 18 years until Joe Nordquest broke it by 1 kilogram (2.2 lb) in 1916.

Around this time, new methods started gaining ground. Lifters began to discover that strong glutes could help them get the bar from the ground to overhead. They would lie on the floor and position the bar over their abdomen, then perform an explosive glute bridge movement, catapulting the bar upwards and catching it at lockout.

Lifting techniques, training, and drugs have improved over the years and the bench press record lift has grown from 164 kilograms (362 lb) to a raw record of 355 kilograms (783 lb) (record held by Julius Maddox) and a shirt-equipped record of 635 kilograms (1,400 lb) (record held by Jimmy Kolb) in approximately 100 years.

== Muscles ==
A conventional bench press uses the pectoralis major, front deltoids, and triceps brachii to horizontally adduct the shoulder. While flat bench pressing, the pectoralis major and pectoralis minor muscles are activated. The exercise also uses the triceps and anconeus to extend the elbows. The triceps are most crucial around the end of the press to help complete and lock out the elbows. With the right form, parts of the deltoids will be used to help make the lift, including the anterior deltoids. Wider hand spacing places a greater emphasis on shoulder flexion and narrower hand spacing utilizes more elbow extension. Because of this, wider hand spacing is associated with training the pectorals and narrower hand spacing is associated with training the triceps. Both close and wide hand spacing train the deltoid area.

In addition to the major phasic (dynamic) muscles, the bench press also uses tonic (stabilizing) muscles, including the scapular stabilizers (serratus anterior, middle, and inferior trapezius), humeral head stabilizers (rotator cuff muscles), and core (transverse abdominis, obliques, multifidus, erector spinae, quadratus lumborum.)

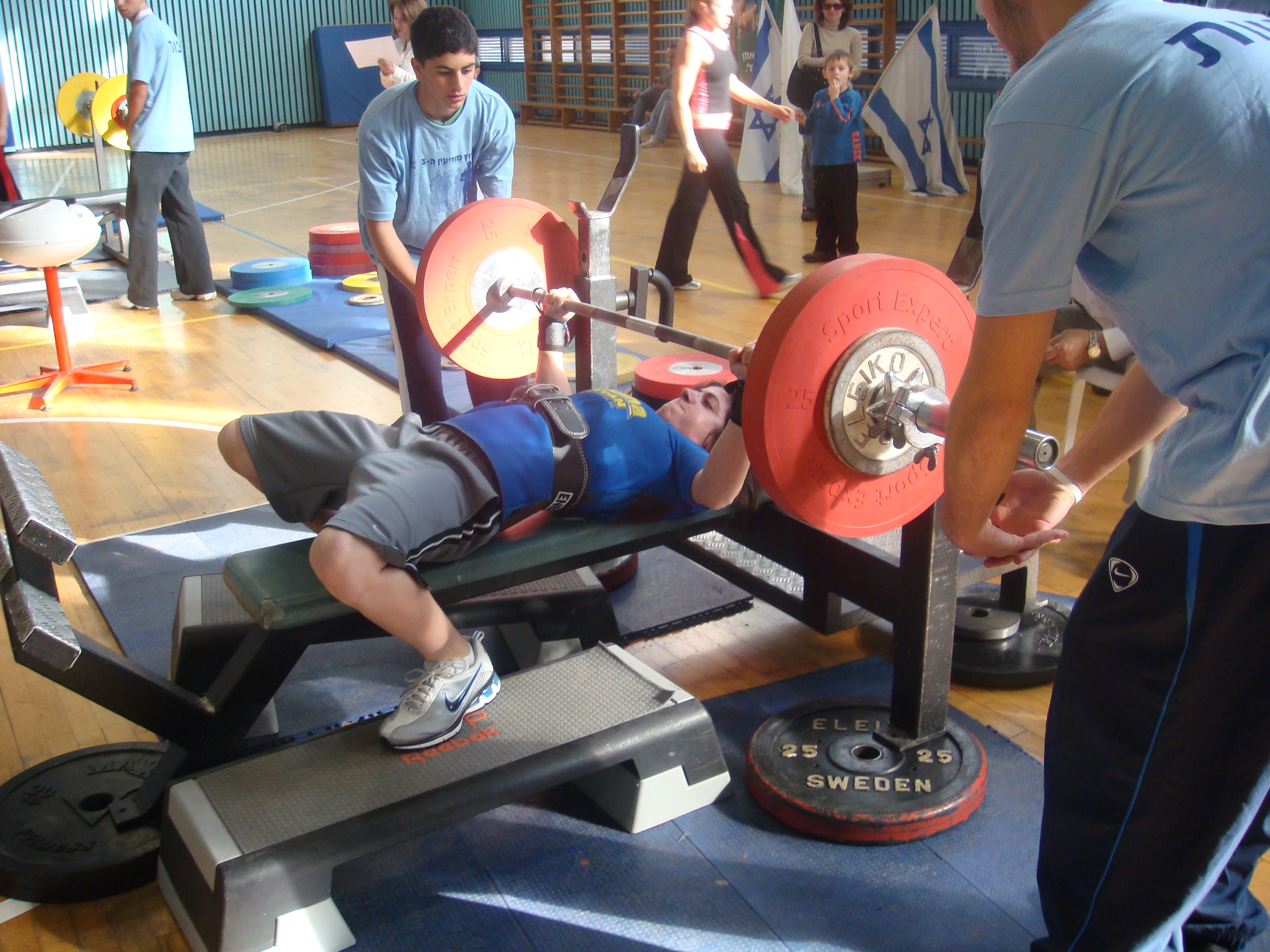
A female athlete performing a bench press at the IPA world championship 2007, in the "Bench Only" category

== Variations ==
Variations of the bench press involve different groups of muscles, or involve the same muscles in different ways.

- Inclination
  - Flat bench press: The flat (or "standard") bench press involves both portions of the pectoralis major muscle but focuses on the lower (sternal) head as well as the anterior deltoid muscle and triceps.
  - Incline bench press: For an incline bench press, the bench should be raised approximately 30 degrees. The incline bench press shifts more emphasis to the upper chest and front deltoids.
  - Decline bench press: A decline bench press elevates the pelvis and lowers the head and emphasizes the lower portion of the pectoralis major whilst incorporating shoulders and triceps. This variation is known as the decline bench press or the decline press.
- Grip
  A woman explains how to properly perform the dumbbell bench press and the dumbbell incline bench press
  - Reverse grip: A reverse grip bench press utilizes an underhand (supinated) grip on the bar. A supinated grip externally rotates the humerus, which puts the shoulders in a much more favorable position for the lift, decreasing injury potential without compromising the range of motion. It emphasizes the clavicular head of the pectoralis major more than an incline bench press. On the eccentric phase of the lift, the bar path will create a larger arc and eventually touch a point on the chest that is lower compared to the regular bench press, because the upper arms and elbows are closer to the body and the angle between the humerus and the torso is smaller.
  - Narrow grip (close grip): A bench press performed with the hands close together. It relies on the triceps to complete the pressing motion. Called the close grip bench press, this variation is best performed with arms in a near-vertical position to reduce strain placed upon the wrists, elbows, and shoulders. A close grip bench press can also be performed with dumbbells or a barbell with neutral grips.
  - Wide grip: A bench press performed with the hands far apart. It shortens the range of motion, lessening the contribution of the triceps.
  - Suicide grip (false grip, thumbless grip): Instead of the thumb being wrapped underneath the barbell, the thumb is placed next to the index finger where it sits on top of the barbell. Although it has its pros and cons, the suicide grip is sometimes used because it places the wrist in a better position, keeping shoulders safer, and allowing lifters to activate their triceps more. This grip is considered unsafe as it presents the risk of the bar rolling out of the lifter's hand which in turn may cause injury by the dropped bar.
- Different lowering targets
  - A lifter can elect to lower the bar to nipple level, to the xiphoid process, or even further, to the abdomen.
  - On the other hand, a lifter may lower the bar to a very high point on the chest, or even to the neck; the latter variation is called a guillotine press (also known as a redneck press or neck press) and emphasizes the upper pectorals.
- Altered stability: The bench press can be performed with various modifications to make the lifter or the weight less stable. Examples include lifting on a Swiss ball, using dumbbells instead of a barbell, or lifting with the legs on the bench or in the air. Lifting with the legs on the bench or out in front of the bench held in the air above the ground neutralizes the athlete's ability to arch his back and glutes off of the bench and thereby gain an advantage while lifting. As it forces the glutes to stay anchored on the bench (it also eliminates the ability of the athlete to employ leg drive), this position is more difficult and allows for greater stress of the pectorals.
- Alternating arms: This involves using a pair of dumbbells and lifting and lowering one and then lifting and lowering the other; or lifting one while lowering the other in an alternating sequence.
- Single arm: This involves using a single dumbbell and lifting it with one arm. When both arms are exercised in this unilateral manner, it can help to ensure that the arms perform the same amount of work and any excessive muscle imbalances are reduced. For example, in a standard barbell bench press, the right arm may perform 55% of the work and the left arm 45%. However, if the right or left arm is used singularly, then it can be assured that each arm is performing 100% of the work for that respective lift. This can mean that the strength of the right and left arms develops more evenly. The single-arm bench press can also mean greater levels of core activation.
- Variable resistance: The bench press can be performed with chains or bands which are attached to either end of the barbell. They can be used to strengthen the upper range of motion in the movement and develop explosive power in the bench press. This means that the percentage of 1RM lifted for the stronger phase (Note: A movement may be considered as having any number of strength phases but usually is considered as having two main phases: a stronger and a weaker. When the movement becomes stronger during the exercise, this is called an ascending strength curve, i.e. bench press, squat, deadlift. When it becomes weaker this is called a descending strength curve, i.e. chin ups, upright row, standing lateral raise. Some exercises involve a different pattern of strong–weak–strong. This is called a bell shaped strength curve, i.e. bicep curls where there can be a sticking point roughly midway.) more closely matches the percentage 1RM for the weaker lower phase e.g., a person can lift 60 kg for one full rep (including the weaker lower phase) but can lift 90 kg for the stronger upper phase. So, by adding resistance they can better meet the respective 1RMs, in percentage terms, for both strength phases. The incorporation of chains and bands can help to develop explosive power in the bench press. An alternative is to combine heavier partial reps with lighter full reps.
- Partial rep: A partial rep usually means lowering the bar partially before raising it again, i.e., for a half or quarter rep.
  - Because this is a stronger ROM, significantly more weight can be lifted. When used in combination with lighter full reps, this can allow a person to better ensure that the percentage of 1RM lifted for the stronger and weaker phases of the movement is more consistent. For example, if 1RM is 100 kg for the lower phase and 150 kg for the upper phase, an 80 kg full ROM press is 80% of someone's 1RM for a full rep and lifting 120 kg for a partial which remains in the stronger phase of the movement is 80% for that phase. Full reps at a 1RM of 100 kg prevents the stronger phase of the lift from being trained at more than about 66% of its respective 1RM of 150 kg. Performing heavier partials can help to increase strength and power and also improve a person's 1RM for a full ROM press.
  - A different form of partial rep involves training the lower most difficult part of the movement in order to strengthen it and to avoid it being a 'sticking point' that stops the movement of the weight.
- Equipped: An "equipped" bench press is performed with a stiff, supportive shirt that allows greater weights to be used. The materials and cut of the bench shirt, as well as the skill of the lifter and the rules of performance, will determine how much additional weight can be pressed in the shirt as opposed to without it. The contrast between equipped and unequipped (raw) bench press weights is illustrated in the progression of the bench press world records, with the record equipped lift exceeding the unequipped lift by hundreds of pounds.
- With minor injury: People who suffer from shoulder injuries can use a specialized barbell such as the Swiss bar or football bar that allows them to hold the bar in a neutral grip, reducing the amount of internal rotation on the shoulder. It also engages the shoulder more, increasing power in upper body movements. Another variation is the hex press in which two dumbbells are squeezed against each other, with the palms facing inwards. This puts the strain of the exercise on the triceps and inner chest rather than the shoulders. The floor press is another variation that puts less strain on the lifter's shoulders, due to the shorter range of motion.

== Use ==
The bench press is used as a test of upper-body explosive strength during the NFL Scouting Combine, where prospective NFL draft picks attempt to get as many reps of 225 pounds (102 kg) as possible.

== Possible injuries ==
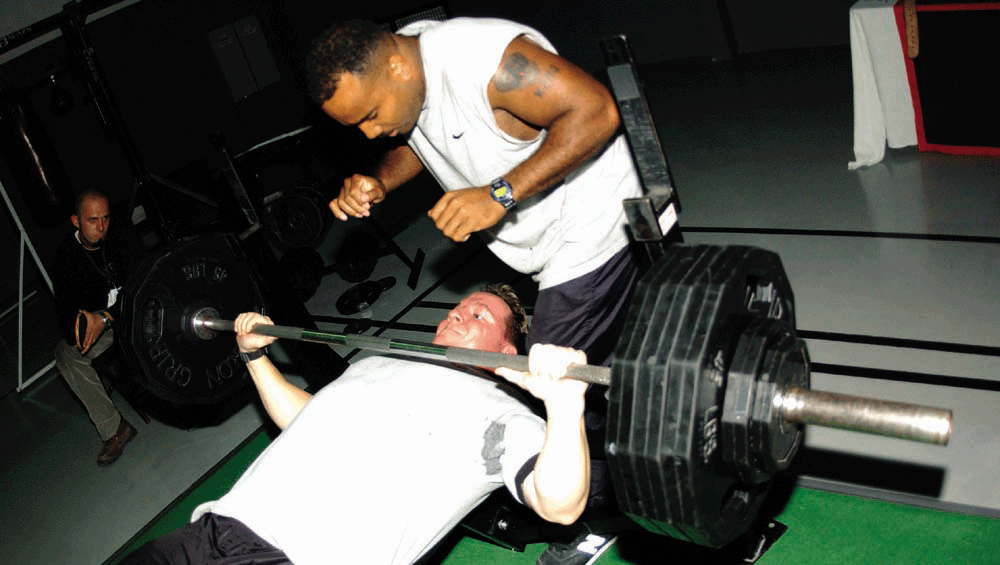
A man (lying down) performs a bench press with a spotter using a thumbless grip.

Performing the bench press can contribute to multiple types of injuries:

- Torn ligaments / tendons in shoulders
- Injuries to the trapezius muscle
- Elbow / wrist strains
- Cracked or broken ribs, usually the result of bouncing the bar off of the chest to add momentum to the lift, or a loss of strength causing the bar to fall onto the chest.
- Distal clavicular osteolysis: bone spur or erosion at the end of the clavicle. Athletes suffering from this condition should avoid doing bench presses.
- Torn or damaged rotator cuff
- Pectoral muscle tear
- Cervical discopathy or, in extreme cases, spinal cord injury. While the mechanism is not clear, lifting the neck or arching the back and leaning on the lower neck while pressing the weight could stress the area.
- Death by asphyxiation by being trapped under the bar (several each year).
- Subclavian vein thrombosis

Many of these possible injuries can be avoided by using dumbbells instead of a barbell since dumbbells can be dropped without hitting the chest or neck, while also allowing greater external rotation of the shoulder which can help prevent shoulder injuries. Studies have also shown dumbbell bench press activates the pectorals more, which can lead to increased muscle growth.

== See also ==
- Overhead press
- Chin-up bar
- Deadlift
- NFL Scouting Combine § Bench press records
- Progression of the bench press world record
- Squat (exercise)
- Pump and run
- Push up

== Sources ==
- McRobert, Stuart (1998). Beyond Brawn. US: CS Publishing Ltd. ISBN 9789963916368.
