= Clean and jerk =

Composite of two weightlifting movements

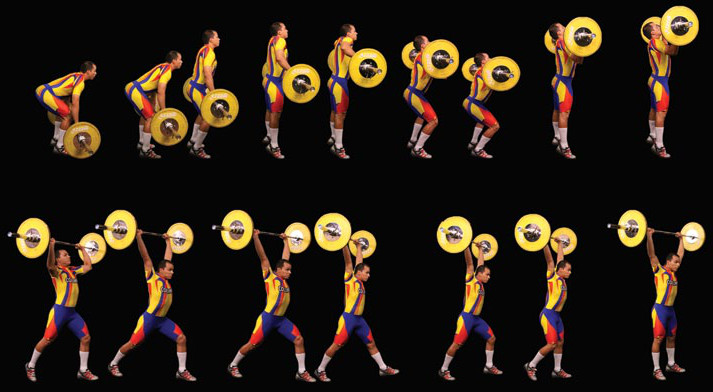
An image series showing the different movements involved in the clean and jerk

The clean and jerk is a composite of two weightlifting movements, most often performed with a barbell: the clean and the jerk. During the clean, the lifter moves the barbell from the floor to a racked position across the deltoids, without resting fully on the clavicles. During the jerk, the lifter raises the barbell to a stationary position above the head, finishing with straight arms and legs, and the feet in the same plane as the torso and barbell.

Of the several variants of the lift, the most common is the Olympic clean and jerk, which, with the snatch, is included in Olympic weightlifting events. Clean and jerk is most commonly performed with a squat clean and a split jerk.

== Clean ==
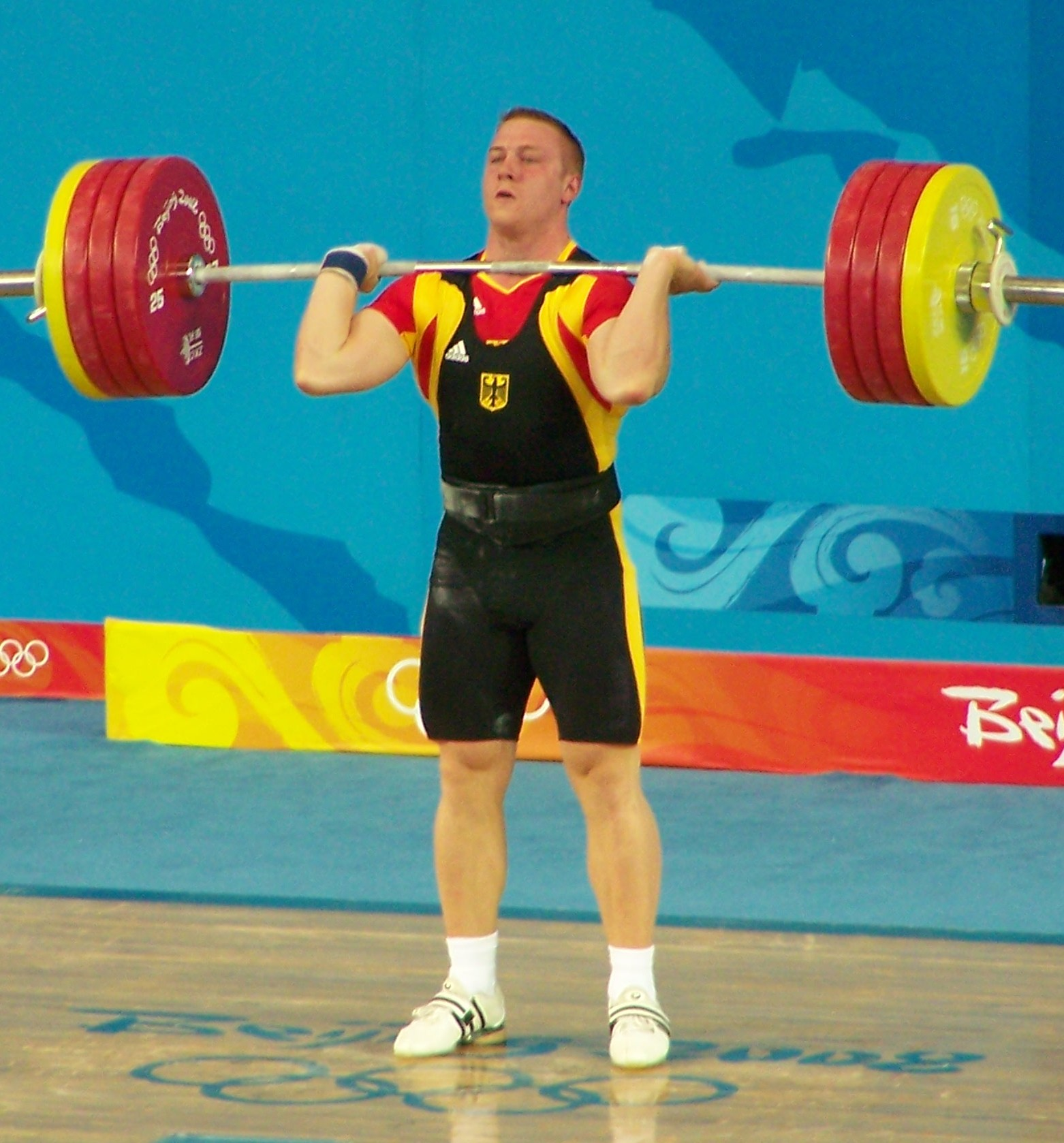
Finishing position of a clean, and starting position of a jerk

The first part of clean and jerk is the clean, which moves the barbell from the ground to shoulder height. To execute a clean, a lifter grasps the barbell just outside the legs, typically using a hook grip. Once the barbell is above the knees, the lifter extends explosively, raising the bar as high as possible before quickly dropping into a squat and receiving it in a "racked" position in front of the neck and resting on the shoulders. To complete the clean, the lifter stands, often propelling the bar upward from the shoulders slightly as the erect position is attained and shifting the grip slightly wider and the feet slightly closer together in preparation for the jerk.

== Jerk ==
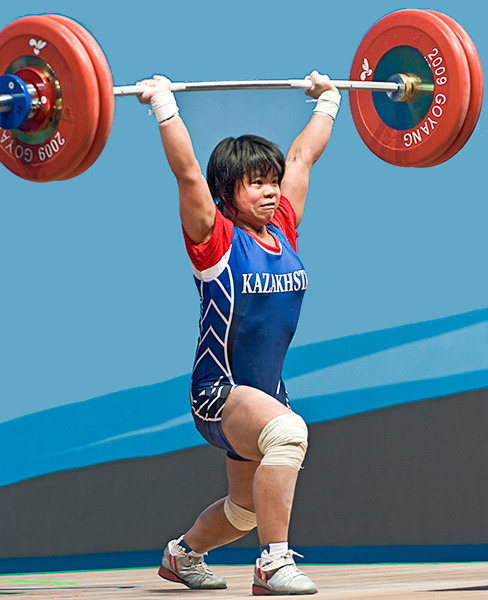
Zulfiya Chinshanlo, world champion 2009 in the 53 kg class performing the jerk portion of the lift with a split jerk

The jerk is a movement that lifts a barbell from the shoulder to the overhead position. It starts from the "front rack" position, which is the finishing position of the clean. The lift begins with the dip-drive phase – the lifter dips a few inches by bending the knees, keeping the back vertical, before driving the barbell explosively upward by straightening the legs. The lifter continues driving the barbell upward by lifting it off the shoulder with the arms, and once the barbell has passed the head, the lifter dips underneath the bar and moves the body into a stable receiving position. How the body moves into the receiving position depends on the style of jerk (split jerk, power jerk, or squat jerk) being performed, with split jerk being the most common. The bar is received overhead on straight arms; once stable, the lifter recovers to a normal standing position, with the legs in the same vertical plane as the rest of the body.

== Variants ==
=== Clean ===
The clean in clean and jerk implies a squat clean. The start of squat clean is similar to a deadlift, the lifter then fully extends and shrugs to pull, moves the bar up while dropping the body under the bar, catching it between the shoulders and clavicles with the elbows up in a squat, before standing up with the bar.

The hang clean is similar to the squat clean, with the difference being beginning the movement with the barbell off the ground; hanging from the arms. Because one can no longer rely on the initial pull from the floor to hoist the bar sufficiently high, successful execution of the hang clean relies on a powerful extension of the hips and a strong consecutive pull.

In split clean, the legs are split during the lift, with one leg forward and the other leg backward before moving to a standing position. It was more common in the past for clean and jerk, but it is now rare. It may be performed by those who do not have the flexibility or are too tall to perform a squat in the clean well.

The continental clean involves lifting the bar from the floor to the final clean position by any method of the lifter's choosing so long as the bar is not upended and does not touch the ground. The bar may be rested on the legs, stomach, or belt. Hands may be removed and replaced. The continental clean plays a special role in strongman training, where the use of a thick axle bar makes the additional steps of a continental clean necessary.

The power clean which is similar to the traditional clean, differs in the catch position of the barbell. To execute the power clean, the lifter needs to catch the bar at or above half squat height, where the hips are positioned above knees as the bar lands on your shoulders. To do so, the lifter must pull the bar up higher in order to catch it, making this a difficult but great exercise to develop a strong pull.

The muscle clean needs much upper body strength to be executed, where once the lifter has extended their knees and hips for that initial upwards drive, they must remain that way. Without dropping into a partial squat to catch the bar on their shoulders, or breaking ones form, they must purely rely on their upper body strength to get the bar onto ones shoulders, making it an extremely difficult movement to accomplish.

=== Jerk ===
The split jerk is the most common of the three forms of jerk used in competitions, therefore the term jerk normally implies a split jerk unless an athlete prefers a different style of jerk. In split jerk, the lifter dips down their hips and propels the barbell upward by performing a short jump. The lifter then 'splits' their legs and catches the bar with straight arms above their head. The split in the split jerk is not as deep as in split clean or split snatch, and moving too low in split jerk can lead to injury.

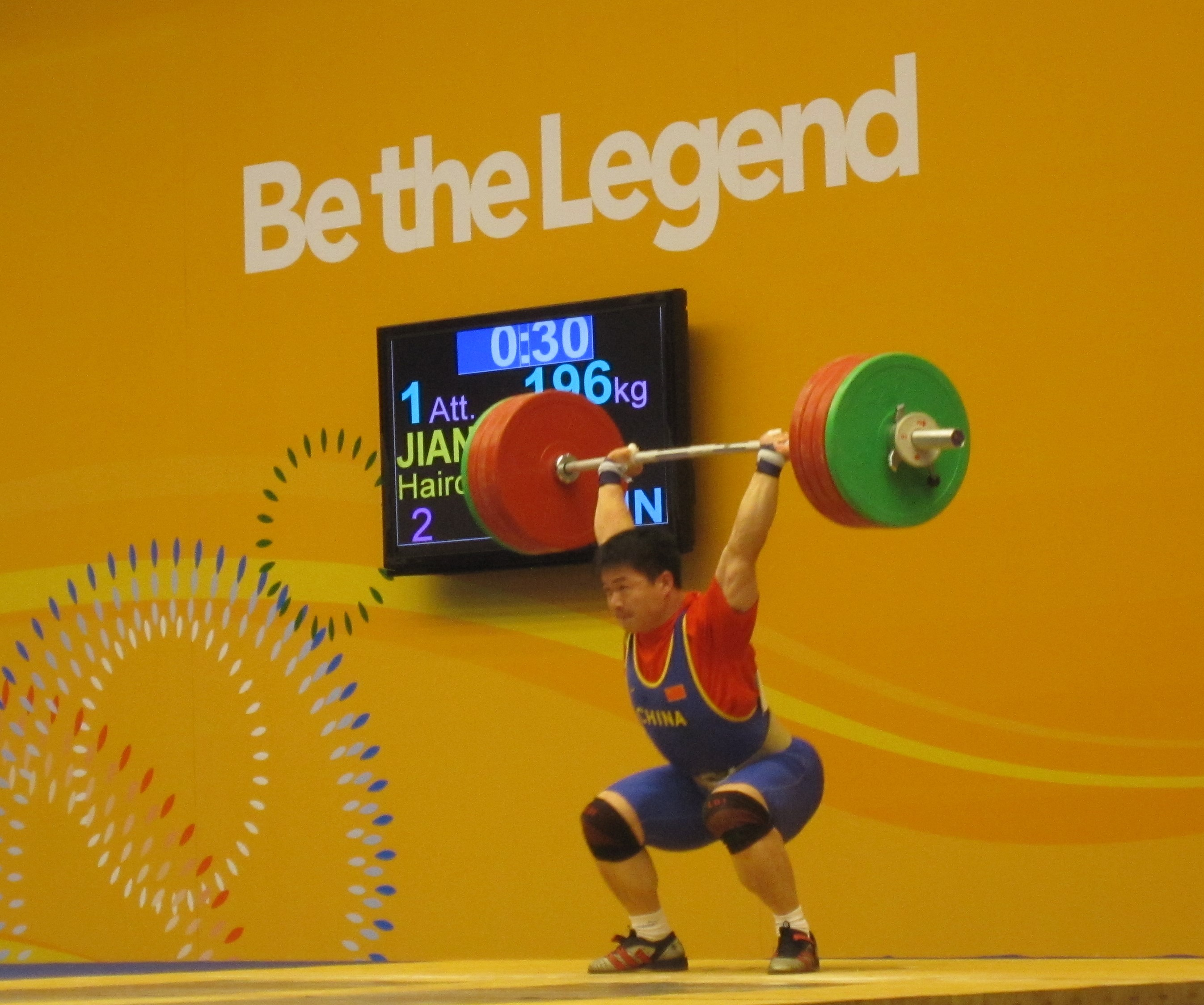
The lifter catches the barbell in a partial squat position in a power jerk, but lowers to a full squat position in a squat jerk

In the power jerk or push jerk, the lifter performs the same dip and jump movement, but unlike the split jerk, the lifter catches the barbell in a partial squat position. Power jerk may be used synonymously with push jerk, but a distinction may be made with push jerk being a type of power jerk where the feet stayed connected to the platform instead of being lifted.

The squat jerk is like the power jerk in how the lifter catches the barbell in a squat position, but unlike the power jerk, the lifter catches the barbell in a full squat position with the barbell locked out above their head. The squat jerk requires considerable shoulder stability and flexibility to avoid injury, and it is therefore practiced only by a small minority of lifters.

=== Single arm ===
A single arm is used instead of two. The weight lifted is usually a dumbbell or kettlebell. A barbell can also be used. The movement is broadly similar to the two armed clean and jerk, although there are various changes to the range of movement and posture. As a form of unilateral exercise, a single arm clean and jerk can be beneficial for core strength as the lifter has to work to stabilise the off-centred weight. It can also help to reduce an excessive strength imbalance which has developed between the different sides of the body. For example, in a two armed clean and jerk, there may be a muscle imbalance meaning that the right arm is performing an excessively large amount of the work and the left arm an excessively small amount. By using the single arm style and alternating between each arm, it can be ensured that each arm is performing the same amount of work.

== World records ==
Men

Weight class	Name	Lift
55 kg	Om Yun-chol	166 kg (366 lb)
61 kg	Hampton Morris	176 kg (388 lb)
67 kg	Ri Won-ju	188 kg (414 lb)
73 kg	Rahmat Erwin Abdullah	201 kg (443 lb)
81 kg	Rahmat Erwin Abdullah	209 kg (461 lb)
89 kg	Karlos Nasar	223 kg (492 lb)
96 kg	Tian Tao	231 kg (509 lb)
102 kg	Liu Huanhua	232 kg (511 lb)
109 kg	Ruslan Nurudinov	242 kg (534 lb)
109+ kg	Lasha Talakhadze	267 kg (589 lb)

Women

Weight class	Name	Lift
45 kg	Won Hyon-sim	109 kg (240 lb)
49 kg	Ri Song-gum	125 kg (276 lb)
55 kg	Kang Hyon-gyong	131 kg (289 lb)
59 kg	Kuo Hsing-chun	140 kg (310 lb)
64 kg	Ri Suk	146 kg (322 lb)
71 kg	Song Kuk-hyang	154 kg (340 lb)
76 kg	Zhang Wangli	156 kg (344 lb)
81 kg	Liang Xiaomei	161 kg (355 lb)
87 kg	World standard	164 kg (362 lb)
87+ kg	Li Wenwen	187 kg (412 lb)

== See also ==
- Clean and press
- List of World records in weightlifting
