= Bakhtiyor Rahimov =

Tajik powerlifter

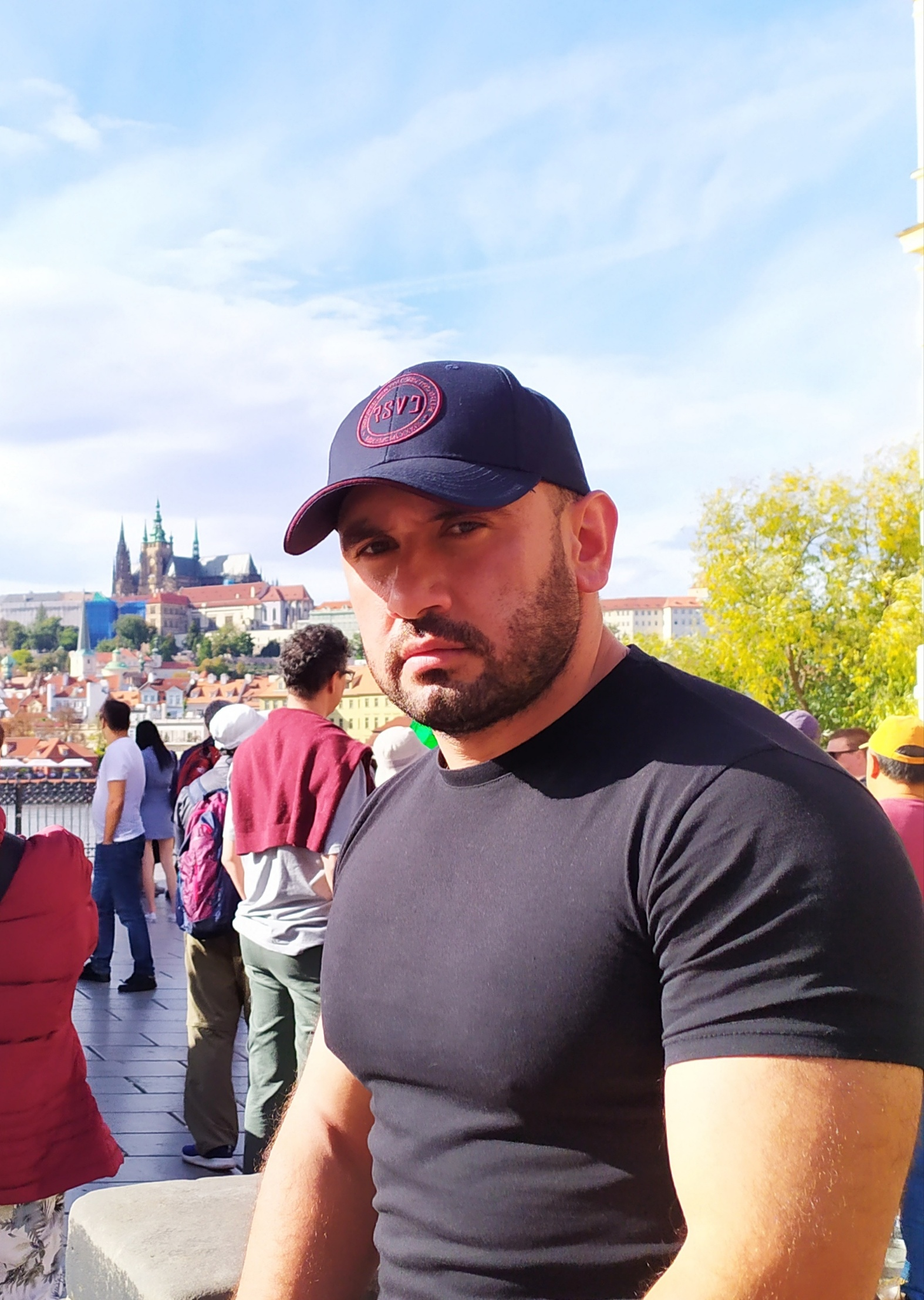
- Born: December 28, 1981; Dushanbe, Tajik SSR, Soviet Union
- Occupation: Powerlifting

Bakhtiyor Rahimov (born 1981 in Dushanbe) is a Tajik powerlifter. Master of Sports of Tajikistan in powerlifting. Powerlifting World Champion. He is a Vice-President of the Federation of Powerlifting, Bodybuilding and Fitness Federation of Tajikistan.

== Career ==
Born 28 December 1981 in Dushanbe. His father, Rashid Rakhimov, Professor of the Department of Higher Mathematics of the Tajik State Finance and Economic University. His mother, Safargul Saidova, was a teacher at the Presidential Lyceum-boarding school for gifted children in Dushanbe.

Graduated school #33 in Dushanbe. Graduated from the Russian-Tajik (Slavonic) University, where he graduated with a degree in law (1998-2003). In 2008, he received a second higher education at the Tajik State University of Commerce.

He started doing sports during his school years. Initially engaged in kickboxing, but then switched to weightlifting. He has been doing powerlifting since 2013. In 2016, he took second and third places in the Tajikistan Powerlifting Championship. After winning at the national level under the guidance of Tole Kholnazarov, Olim Parpiev and Khayriddin Rizoev, he began to prepare for participation in international competitions.

In September 2017, the World Championship “Golden Tiger-11” (NPA) was held in Yekaterinburg, Russia, where Bakhtiyor Rahimov won six gold and one bronze medals. In December 2017, at the Asian Open Powerlifting Championship “Steel Arena 7” (NPA), held in Berdsk, Russia, he won five gold and one silver medals. Later in December 2017, at the European Power Sports Cup (NPA), which was held in Yekaterinburg, Russia, he won two gold and one bronze medals. In the same year, after winning at the international level, he was awarded the title of master of sports in powerlifting and deadlift from the Russian organization "National Powerlifting Association" (NPA).

In September 2018, the Russian city of Yekaterinburg hosted the World Powerlifting Championship - Golden Tiger-12 (NPA), where Bakhtiyor Rahimov won four gold, one silver, and one bronze medals. In October 2018, at the World Powerlifting Championship (WRPF), held in Moscow (Russia), he won one gold and two bronze medals.

In September 2019, he participated in the international festival "Arnold Classic Europe" (IPF), which was held in Barcelona, Spain. In October 2019, the Russian Powerlifting Championship “Golden Tiger-13” (NPA) was held in Yekaterinburg, Russia, where Bakhtiyor Rakhimov won three gold medals. In December 2019, at the World Powerlifting Cup (WPC), held in Moscow, he won a gold medal(WPC), held in Moscow, Russia, he won a gold medal.

In 2021, he participated in the World Powerlifting Championship (IPF) which was held in Halmstad, Sweden.

In November 2022, in the World Powerlifting Championship, which was held in Orlando (Florida, USA), Rakhimov won a gold medal in powerlifting competitions and a silver medal in deadlift competitions.

He is the master of sports of Tajikistan in powerlifting. And also a vice-president of the Federation of Powerlifting, Bodybuilding and Fitness Federation of Tajikistan.

== Statistics ==
The list shows the results in international competitions.

Year	Tournament	Organizer	Place	Weight	Medals
2017	World Powerlifting Championship “Golden Tiger-11”	NPA	Yekaterinburg	82,5 kg	6 gold, 1 bronze
2017	Asian Open Cup “Steel Arena 7”	NPA, ASBC	Berdsk	90 kg	5 gold, 1 silver
2017	European Cup in powerlifting and power sports	NPA	Yekaterinburg	90 kg	2 gold, 1 bronze
2018	World Powerlifting Championship “Golden Tiger-12”	NPA	Yekaterinburg	90 kg	4 gold, 1 bronze, 1 silver
2018	Powerlifting World Championship	WRPF	Moscow	90 kg	1 gold, 2 bronzes
2019	Arnold Classic Europe	IPF	Barcelona	105 kg	
2019	World Powerlifting Championship “Golden Tiger-13”	NPA	Yekaterinburg	100 kg	3 gold
2019	World Powerlifting Cup	WPC/AWPC	Moscow	100 kg	1 gold
2021	World Powerlifting Championship	IPF	Halmstad	105 kg	
2022	World Powerlifting Championship	WPC	Orlando, Florida	110 kg	1 gold, 1 silver
