= Thomas Davis Sr. =

American football player (born 1983)

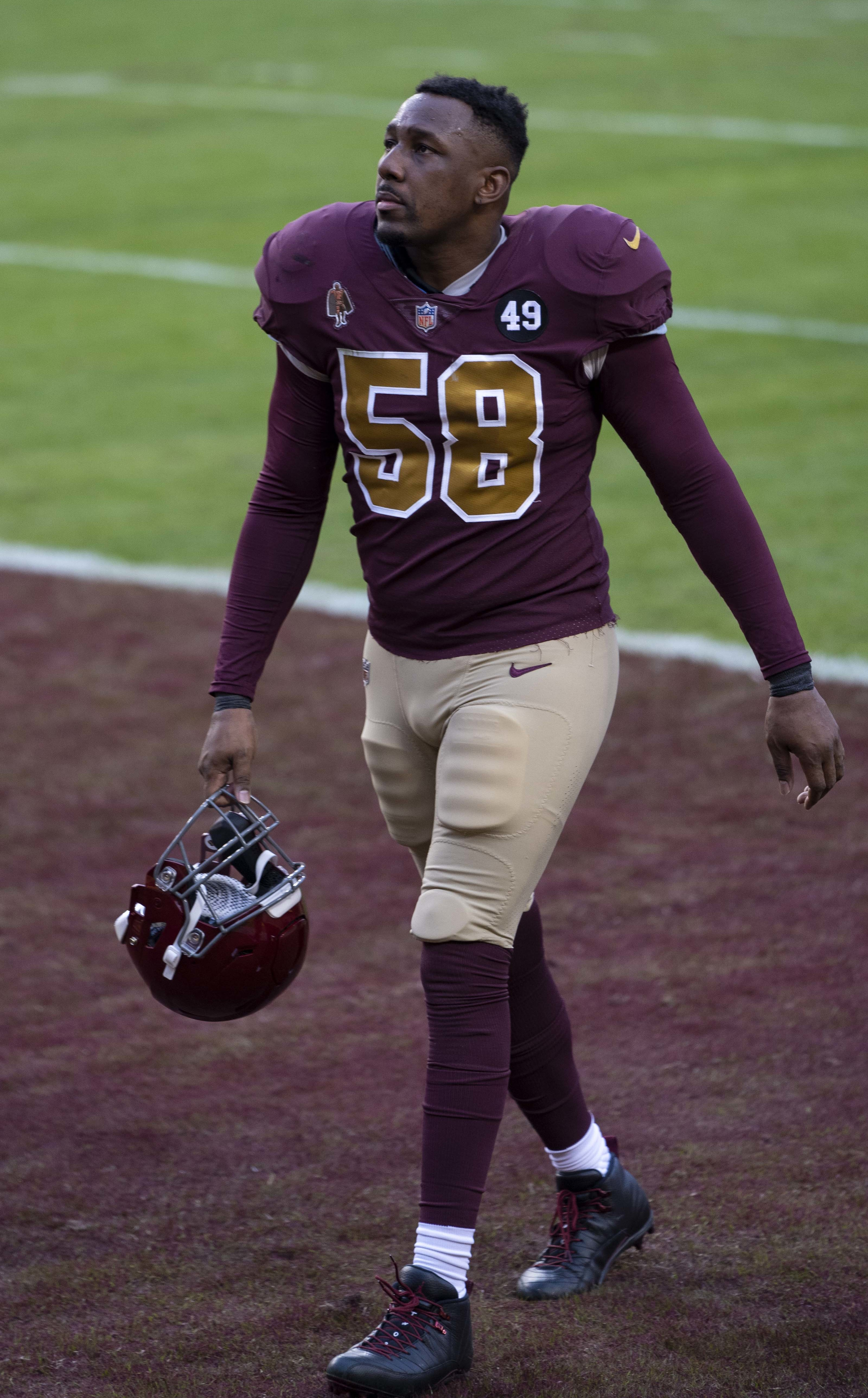
- Davis with the Washington Football Team in 2020

No. 47, 58
- Position: Linebacker

Personal information
- Born: March 22, 1983 (age 43); Shellman, Georgia, U.S.
- Listed height: 6 ft 1 in (1.85 m)
- Listed weight: 235 lb (107 kg)

Career information
- High school: Randolph-Clay (Cuthbert, Georgia)
- College: Georgia (2002–2004)
- NFL draft: 2005: 1st round, 14th overall pick

Career history
- Carolina Panthers (2005–2018); Los Angeles Chargers (2019); Washington Football Team (2020)

Awards and highlights
- Walter Payton Man of the Year (2014); First-team All-Pro (2015); 3× Pro Bowl (2015–2017); Consensus All-American (2004); 2× First-team All-SEC (2003, 2004)

Career NFL statistics
- Total tackles: 1,216
- Sacks: 29.0
- Forced fumbles: 18
- Fumble recoveries: 11
- Pass deflections: 55
- Interceptions: 13
- Defensive touchdowns: 1
- Stats at Pro Football Reference

Thomas Antonio Davis Sr. (born March 22, 1983) is an American former professional football player who was a linebacker for 16 seasons in the National Football League (NFL). He played college football for the University of Georgia in the early 2000s, where he was recognized as a consensus All-American.

Davis was selected by the Carolina Panthers in the first round of the 2005 NFL draft and played for them for 14 years. Following short stints with the Los Angeles Chargers and Washington Football Team, he retired after the 2020 season. Davis recovered from three ACL tears during his career.

== Early life ==
Thomas Antonio Davis Sr. was born on March 22, 1983, in Shellman, Georgia. He attended Randolph-Clay High School in Cuthbert, Georgia, where he was a four-sport star in football, basketball, baseball, and track. In football, he played running back, wide receiver, quarterback, defensive end, defensive back, punter, kicker, and kick returner at various times throughout his career. As a junior, he averaged 30 yards per punt, had two kickoff returns, one punt return, and one fumble return for touchdowns. As a senior, he earned Class AA All-State honorable mention by The Atlanta Journal-Constitution and Georgia Sports Writers Association (GSWA) after rushing for 1,032 yards, leading the region in scoring with 108 points in the regular season.

In addition to football, Davis played baseball and ran track, where he qualified for the GHSAAA State T&F Championships for the 100-meter dash, placing 6th with a time of 11.1 seconds, and the 400 relay, finishing in 43.98 seconds. In the agility tests, he ran a 4.54-second 40-yard dash, had a 355-pound bench press, 520-pound squat, 324-pound hang clean and 34-inch vertical jump.

== College career ==
Davis received an athletic scholarship to attend the University of Georgia, where he played for coach Mark Richt's Georgia Bulldogs football team from 2002 to 2004. Following his sophomore season in 2003, he earned second-team All-Southeastern Conference (SEC) honors. He was recognized as a first-team All-SEC selection and a consensus first-team All-American after his junior season in 2004. In 39 career games, he was effective as both a rush linebacker and a free safety, recording 272 tackles, 18 for a loss, 10.5 sacks, three interceptions, six forced fumbles, and nine fumble recoveries. He majored in consumer economics.

== Professional career ==
=== Pre-draft ===
Davis opted to forgo his remaining eligibility and enter the 2005 NFL draft as an underclassman. He attended the NFL Scouting Combine and completed the majority of drills, but opted to skip the bench press. Davis finished second among all linebackers who participated in the 40-yard dash, behind Texas linebacker Derrick Johnson. On March 22, 2005, Davis attended Georgia's pro day, but opted to stand on the majority of his combine numbers and only ran the 40-yard dash and participated in positional drills. He improved his time in the 40-yard dash, finishing with a 4.52. At the conclusion of the pre-draft process, Davis was projected to be a first round pick by NFL draft experts and scouts. He was regarded as one of the top safeties in the draft and was highly touted for his versatility and ability to play safety or linebacker. Davis was ranked as the top safety prospect in the draft by Scouts Inc. and ESPN and was ranked as the top free safety by DraftScout.com and the Chicago Tribune.

Pre-draft measurables
Height	Weight	Arm length	Hand span	40-yard dash	10-yard split	20-yard split	20-yard shuttle	Three-cone drill	Vertical jump	Broad jump
6 ft 1 in (1.85 m)	230 lb (104 kg)	32 in (0.81 m)	10 1/4 in (0.26 m)	4.66 s	1.72 s	2.81 s	3.97 s	7.09 s	36 1/2 in (0.93 m)	9 ft 7 in (2.92 m)
All values from NFL Combine

=== Carolina Panthers ===
==== 2005 ====
The Carolina Panthers selected Davis in the first round (14th overall) of the 2005 NFL draft. Thomas was the first safety drafted in 2005.

On July 26, 2005, the Carolina Panthers signed Davis to a five-year, $10.60 million contract that includes $7.97 million guaranteed. The contract has a maximum value of $13.20 million with incentives and performance bonuses.

Davis entered training camp as a safety, but also learned the linebacker position. On August 15, 2005, it was reported that the Carolina Panthers moved Davis to outside linebacker after Brandon Short injured his foot during a preseason game against the Washington Redskins. On August 20, 2005, starting strong safety Colin Branch tore his ACL during the Panthers’ 27–21 loss at the New York Giants in their third preseason game. Defensive coordinator Mike Trgovac opted to move Davis back to strong safety as a replacement for Branch. Head coach John Fox named Davis the starting strong safety to begin the regular season, alongside free safety Mike Minter.

He made his professional regular season debut and first career start in the Carolina Panthers’ season-opener against the New Orleans Saints and recorded five combined tackles during their 23–20 loss. Davis struggled during their loss against the Saints and was demoted to backup strong safety behind Marlon McCree for the following game. On September 18, 2005, Davis recorded two solo tackles and made his first career sack in a 27–17 victory against the New England Patriots in Week 2. Davis sacked Patriots’ quarterback Tom Brady for a ten-yard loss during the second quarter. On December 4, 2005, Davis played as an outside linebacker against the Atlanta Falcons and was used as a quarterback spy to contain Falcons’ quarterback Michael Vick. Davis was instrumental in the Panthers’ 24–6 victory against Atlanta, making four combined tackles and being credited with half a sack. Davis and strong safety Mike Minter lined up in the box and were used to contain Vick as the Panthers defeated the Falcons for the first time in franchise history since the latter had drafted Vick in 2001. In Week 17, Davis collected a season-high five solo tackles during a 44–41 victory at the Falcons. He finished his rookie season in 2005 with 38 combined tackles (31 solo) and 1.5 sacks in 16 games and one start.

The Carolina Panthers finished second in the NFC South with an 11–5 record in 2005 and earned a playoff berth. On January 8, 2006, Davis appeared in his first career playoff game and recorded one tackle and made one sack during the Panthers’ 23–0 victory at the New York Giants in the NFC Wildcard Game. The following week, Davis made three solo tackles during a 29–21 win at the Chicago Bears in the NFC Divisional Round. The Panthers were eliminated from the playoffs after a 34–14 loss at the Seattle Seahawks in the NFC Championship Game.

==== 2006 ====
Davis entered training camp slated as a starting outside linebacker after Will Witherspoon departed for the St. Louis Rams. He also changed his jersey number to No. 58 after wearing No. 47 during his rookie season. Head coach John Fox named Davis a starting outside linebacker to begin the regular season. Davis started alongside Na'il Diggs and starting middle linebacker Chris Draft. In Week 5, he collected a season-high 11 combined tackles (nine solo) during a 20–12 win against the Cleveland Browns. Davis was inactive for the Panthers’ Week 7 loss at the Cincinnati Bengals. On November 19, 2006, Davis made ten combined tackles (nine solo) and recorded a season-high 1.5 sacks on Rams’ quarterback Marc Bulger during a 15–0 victory against the St. Louis Rams in Week 11. Davis was inactive for the Panthers’ Week 17 win at the New Orleans Saints. He finished the 2006 NFL season with 88 combined tackles (69 solo), six pass deflections, and 1.5 sacks on 14 games and 14 starts.

==== 2007 ====
Head coach John Fox retained Davis and Na’il Diggs as the starting outside linebackers to begin the season in 2007. They started alongside middle linebacker Jon Beason. In Week 3, he collected a season-high eight combined tackles (seven solo) as the Panthers defeated the Atlanta Falcons 27–20. On December 22, 2007, Davis recorded seven combined tackles, deflected two passes, and made his first career interception during a 20–13 loss to the Dallas Cowboys in Week 16. Davis intercepted a pass by Cowboys’ quarterback Tony Romo, that was originally intended for wide receiver Patrick Crayton, in the fourth quarter. Davis started in all 16 games in 2007 and recorded 88 combined tackles (72 solo), five pass deflections, three sacks, two forced fumbles, and one interception.

==== 2008 ====
Head coach John Fox retained Davis, Na’il Diggs, and Jon Beason as the starting linebackers in 2008. In Week 11, he collected a season-high 11 combined tackles (ten solo) and was credited with half a sack in the Panthers’ 31–22 win against the Detroit Lions. On December 21, 2008, Davis tied his season-high of 11 combined tackles (nine solo) and made one sack during a 34–28 loss at the New York Giants in Week 16. He started in all 16 games in 2008 and recorded 113 combined tackles (92 solo), six passes defensed, 3.5 sacks, and two forced fumbles.

==== 2009 ====
On January 22, 2009, it was announced that Carolina Panthers’ defensive coordinator Mike Trgovac opted not to return and resigned from his role as defensive coordinator. On January 26, 2009, the Carolina Panthers announced their decision to hire former Indianapolis Colts’ defensive coordinator Ron Meeks to be their new defensive coordinator. Head coach John Fox retained Davis, Na’il Diggs, and Jon Beason as the starting linebackers for the third consecutive season.

Davis started in the Carolina Panthers’ season-opener against the Philadelphia Eagles and recorded a season-high 16 combined tackles (14 solo) during their 38–10 loss. On October 18, 2009, Davis recorded eight solo tackles, broke up two passes, and intercepted a pass by Buccaneers’ quarterback Josh Johnson during a 28–21 win at the Tampa Bay Buccaneers in Week 6. On November 8, 2009, Davis sustained a leg injury during the third quarter of the Panthers’ 30–20 loss at the New Orleans Saints and did not return. On November 10, 2009, the Carolina Panthers placed Davis on injured reserve after it was discovered he had torn his ACL. He finished the season with 61 combined tackles (48 solo), five pass deflections, two interceptions, and 1.5 sacks in seven games and seven starts.

==== 2010 ====
On June 8, 2010, Davis tore his ACL on the second day of minicamp. The injury occurred while Davis was backpedaling during a non-contact drill. On August 31, 2010, the Carolina Panthers placed Davis on their physically unable to perform list.

==== 2011 ====
On January 1, 2011, the Carolina Panthers announced their decision to fire head coach John Fox after the Panthers finished with a 2–14 record in 2010. On January 13, 2011, the Carolina Panthers announced the hiring of former San Diego Chargers’ defensive coordinator Ron Rivera as their new head coach.

On July 29, 2011, the Carolina Panthers signed Davis to a five-year, $36.50 million contract that includes a signing bonus of $7 million. The contract also included an $8 million option bonus for 2012. On September 18, 2011, Davis tore his ACL in his right knee during third quarter of the Panthers’ 30–23 loss to the Green Bay Packers in Week 2. The injury occurred when Davis right leg was caught up in a pile of players. On September 19, 2011, the Carolina Panthers officially placed Davis on injured reserve. This became Davis’ third torn ACL in 23 months. No professional athlete had ever recovered and returned to play after three ACL tears in the same knee. He stated at the time that he would become the first and hoped to be an inspiration to others. Davis finished the 2011 NFL season with 12 combined tackles (six solo) and was limited to two games and two starts.

==== 2012 ====
On March 13, 2012, the Carolina Panthers chose not to exercise an $8 million bonus option on his five-year, $36.50 million contract. On February 25, 2012, the Carolina Panthers restructured Davis’ contract in order to save cap $3.80 million in cap space. His base salary for 2012 was restructured from $2.20 million to the veteran minimum of $700,000.

Davis was held out of minicamp as he recovered from ACL surgery, but returned in time to participate in training camp. Davis had been replaced as the starting weakside linebacker by rookie first round pick Luke Kuechly. He competed against James Anderson to be the starting strongside linebacker. Head coach Ron Rivera named Davis the backup strongside linebacker, behind James Anderson, to begin the regular season. On September 9, 2012, Davis recorded three combined tackles during the Panthers’ season-opening 16–10 loss at the Tampa Bay Buccaneers. He became the first known player to successfully return to active competition after suffering three torn ACLs on the same knee. Davis was inactive during the Panthers’ Week 3 loss to the New York Giants due to a hamstring injury. Davis was named the starting weakside linebacker in a Week 5 after Jon Beason sustained a shoulder injury and was replaced by Luke Kuechly after being placed on injured reserve on October 24, 2012. On November 18, 2012, Davis collected a season-high 16 combined tackles (11 solo) during the Panthers’ 27–21 loss to the Tampa Bay Buccaneers in Week 11. In Week 14, Davis recorded seven combined tackles, deflected a pass, and made an interception during a 30–20 victory against the Atlanta Falcons. Davis finished the 2012 NFL season with 105 combined tackles (70 solo), three pass deflections, two forced fumbles, and one interception in 15 games and 12 starts.

==== 2013 ====
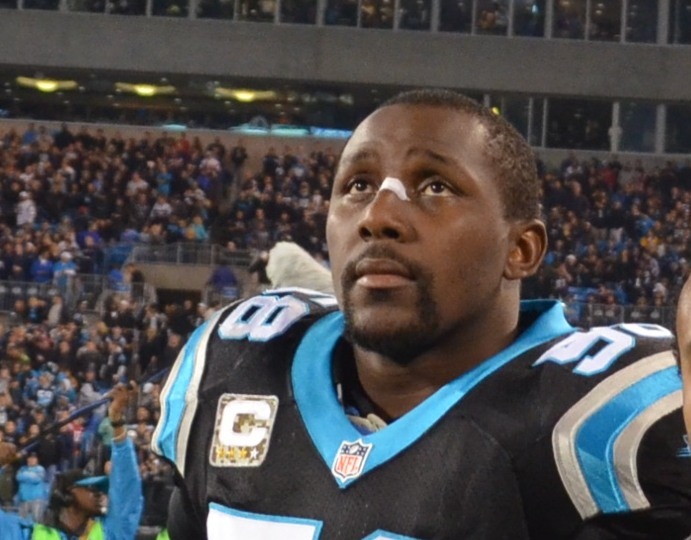
Davis in 2013

After three years of injuries, Davis started all 16 games and recorded a career-high 123 tackles and four sacks, in addition to two interceptions and a forced fumble. He was named the NFC Defensive Player of the Month of November and won the NFC Defensive Player of the Week during week 6. He played alongside Chase Blackburn and Luke Kuechly to help Carolina achieve a second-ranked defense.

==== 2014 ====
Through the first five weeks of the 2014 season, Pro Football Focus rated Davis as the best 4-3 outside linebacker in coverage. In the must-win finale at Atlanta, Davis returned a fumble 33 yards to set up a crucial touchdown that started the rout of the Falcons. The Panthers won the game 34–3, becoming the first team in the NFC South to win back-to-back division titles and sending the Panthers into the playoffs for the second year in a row, the first time in franchise history. Davis' leadership, play, and consistency was a big contributor in these achievements, along with those same attributes found in Kuechly and tight end Greg Olsen. In the Panthers wild-card playoff matchup against the Arizona Cardinals, Davis was a part of a stifling defense that set an NFL record for fewest yards allowed in a playoff game, limiting the Cardinals to just 78 total yards and forcing three turnovers. According to Pro Football Focus, Davis was the best defensive player on the field, registering seven tackles while also grading out as the best player in coverage for the Panthers, showcasing his roots as a safety. For the season, Davis was among the league leaders in pass coverage linebackers allowing just 7.1 yards per reception. On January 31, 2015, Davis was named the 2014 Walter Payton Man of the Year by the NFL, recognizing his off-the-field community service work.

==== 2015 ====
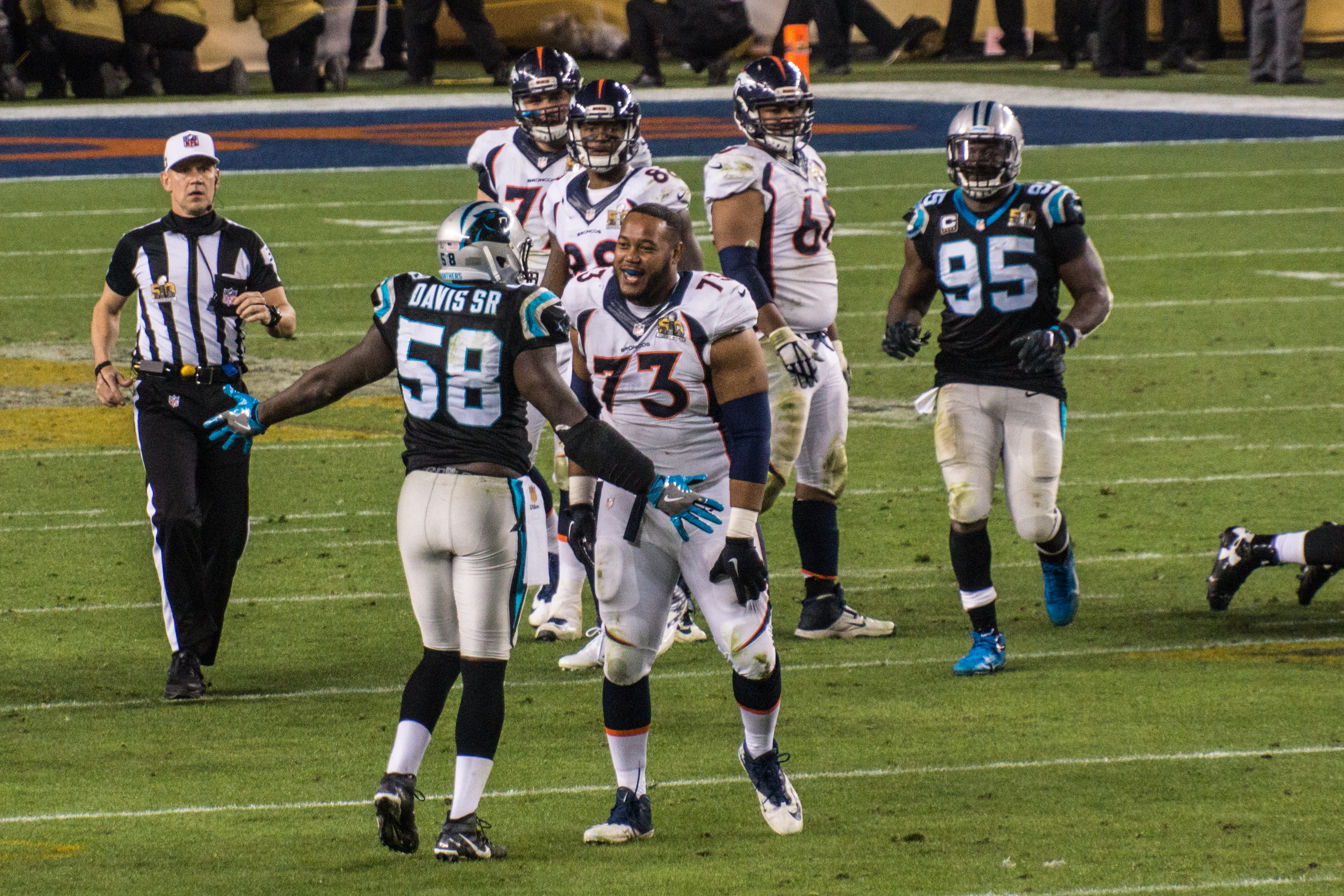
Davis (58) during Super Bowl 50

On June 15, 2015, Davis signed a two-year contract extension. In 2015, Davis changed the back of his jersey from "Davis" to "Davis Sr" at the request of his son. Davis continued his outstanding play during the start of the 2015 NFL season, recording 25 tackles, 1 interception, and 1 forced fumble through just the first three games. The next week against the Tampa Bay Buccaneers Davis recorded 11 tackles and 1 interception in a 37–23 victory. Davis played very well during the Panthers Sunday Night victory over the Philadelphia Eagles recording a season high 13 tackles. Through the first 15 weeks of the 2015 NFL season, Davis set career highs in sacks (5.5) and interceptions (3). For his efforts, Davis was named to the 2016 Pro Bowl, a rare honor to an outside linebacker in a 4-3 defense. Davis finished the regular season with 105 total tackles, 5.5 sacks, and 4 interceptions. He was named to the AP All-Pro First Team. During the Divisional Round Playoffs, another showdown against Seattle, Davis secured the Panthers win by catching the Seahawks onside kick attempt with 1:12 left in the game, sending the Panthers into the NFC Championship Game. It was Davis' second onside kick recovery of the season, the first coming against the Dallas Cowboys Thanksgiving night game. Davis returned to the NFC Championship game for the first time since his rookie season in 2005, the only active Panther to have played in both conference championship games. Davis was knocked out of the conference win in the second quarter with a broken arm, and finished the game with six tackles. He vowed to return for the Super Bowl and went into surgery early the following morning on the arm to uphold that promise. Davis played in Super Bowl 50. In the game, he recorded seven tackles, but the Panthers fell to the Denver Broncos by a score of 24–10. According to Pro Football Focus, Davis had the second-highest coverage grade of any linebacker in the NFL behind only teammate, Luke Kuechly. He received the Bart Starr Award and was ranked 54th on the NFL Top 100 Players of 2016.

==== 2016 ====
Davis started all 16 games, recording 106 tackles, 2.5 sacks, 4 passes defensed and 3 interceptions. He was named to his second straight Pro Bowl, and was ranked 89th on the NFL Top 100 Players of 2017.

==== 2017 ====
On August 15, 2017, Davis signed a one-year contract extension with the Panthers through the 2018 season. On November 3, Davis was fined $48,620 for a helmet-to-helmet hit on Adam Humphries in Week 8 against the Tampa Bay Buccaneers. On December 18, 2017, Davis was suspended two games after an illegal helmet-to-helmet hit to Packers wide receiver Davante Adams which caused a concussion. The next day, his suspension was reduced to one game after an appeal. He finished the season with 76 combined tackles and 2.5 sacks, on his way to his third straight Pro Bowl. He was ranked 73rd by his peers on the NFL Top 100 Players of 2018.

==== 2018 ====
On January 12, 2018, Davis declared that the 2018 NFL season would be his last one. On April 6, 2018, Davis was suspended the first four games of the 2018 season for violating the league's policy on performance-enhancing drugs. After the season, Davis stated that he would not be returning to the Panthers.

=== Los Angeles Chargers ===
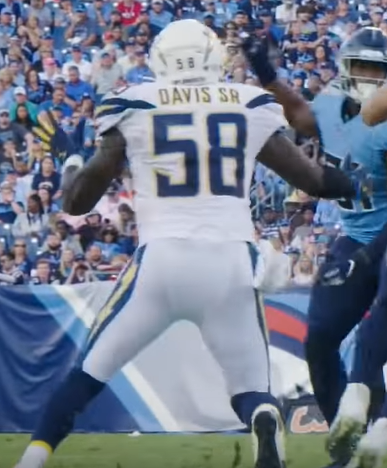
Davis with the Los Angeles Chargers in 2019

On March 13, 2019, Davis signed a two-year, $10.5 million contract with the Los Angeles Chargers. In the team's season opener against the Indianapolis Colts, he recorded 14 tackles in a 30–24 overtime win. Davis was released on March 13, 2020.

=== Washington Football Team ===
On March 26, 2020, Davis signed with the Washington Football Team, then known as the Redskins prior to a name change later that offseason. He announced his plans to retire following the season, with Washington releasing him on March 3, 2021. He signed a one-day contract with the Panthers on March 11.

== NFL career statistics ==
Legend
**Bold**	Career high

=== Regular season ===
Year	Team	Games		Tackles				Interceptions						Fumbles	
Year	Team	GP	GS	Comb	Solo	Ast	Sack	PD	Int	Yds	Avg	Lng	TD	FF	FR
2005	CAR	16	1	38	31	7	1.5	0	—	—	—	—	—	2	0
2006	CAR	14	14	88	69	19	1.5	6	—	—	—	—	—	2	0
2007	CAR	16	16	88	72	16	3.0	5	1	0	0.0	0	0	2	1
2008	CAR	16	16	113	**92**	21	3.5	6	—	—	—	—	—	2	1
2009	CAR	7	7	61	48	13	1.5	5	2	24	**12.0**	24	0	0	0
2010	CAR	0	0	Did not play due to injury											
2011	CAR	2	2	12	6	6	0.0	0	—	—	—	—	—	0	1
2012	CAR	15	12	105	70	35	0.0	3	1	0	0.0	0	0	2	1
2013	CAR	16	16	**123**	85	38	4.0	**7**	2	-2	-1.0	-1	0	1	0
2014	CAR	15	15	100	66	34	2.5	3	—	—	—	—	—	2	1
2015	CAR	16	16	105	75	30	**5.5**	**7**	**4**	22	5.5	22	0	**4**	1
2016	CAR	16	16	106	73	33	2.5	4	3	**35**	11.7	**31**	0	1	**2**
2017	CAR	15	15	76	52	24	2.5	0	—	—	—	—	—	0	1
2018	CAR	12	12	79	46	33	0.0	6	—	—	—	—	—	0	**2**
2019	LAC	16	16	112	65	**47**	1.0	2	—	—	—	—	—	0	0
2020	WAS	7	0	6	5	1	0.0	1	—	—	—	—	—	0	0
Career		199	174	1,212	855	357	29.0	55	13	85	6.1	31	0	18	11

=== Postseason ===
Year	Team	Games		Tackles				Interceptions						Fumbles	
Year	Team	GP	GS	Comb	Solo	Ast	Sack	PD	Int	Yds	Avg	Lng	TD	FF	FR
2005	CAR	3	0	6	6	0	**1.0**	—	—	—	—	—	—	0	0
2008	CAR	1	1	10	9	1	0.0	—	—	—	—	—	—	0	0
2013	CAR	1	1	8	4	4	0.0	—	—	—	—	—	—	0	0
2014	CAR	2	2	16	**10**	6	**1.0**	—	—	—	—	—	—	0	0
2015	CAR	3	3	**18**	**10**	**8**	0.0	—	—	—	—	—	—	0	0
2017	CAR	1	1	4	4	0	0.0	—	—	—	—	—	—	0	0
2020	WAS	0	0	Did not play due to injury											
Career		11	8	62	43	19	2.0	0	0	0	0.0	0	0	0	0

== Personal life ==
Davis married Kelly Davis in March 2008 and the couple has four children, Skyy, Denim, Thomas Jr. and Mattison. Their wedding was featured on WEtv's "Platinum Weddings." In 2025, the couple officially finalized their divorce after being separated for several years.

Davis is an Evangelical Christian. Davis' cousin, Robert Davis, played wide receiver in the NFL. In November 2024, Davis’ son Thomas Jr. committed to Notre Dame’s 2026 class as a linebacker.
