= Konstantīns Konstantinovs =

Latvian strongman

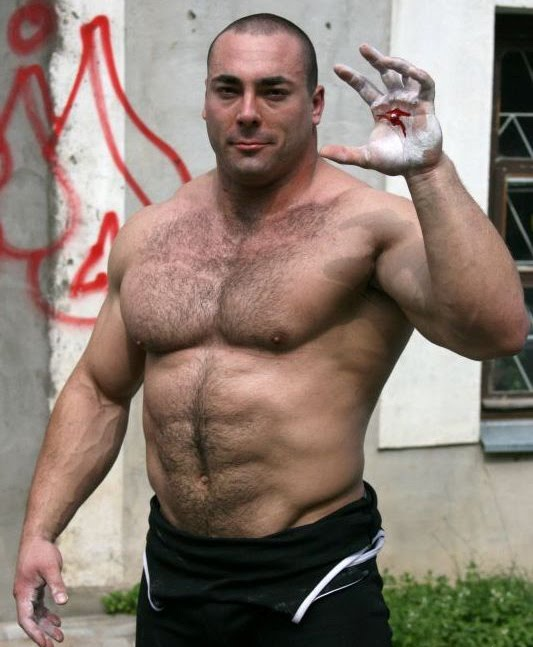
- Born: Konstantin Konstantinov; June 6, 1978; Liepāja, Latvian SSR, Soviet Union
- Died: October 28, 2018 (aged 40)
- Occupation: Powerlifting
- Known for: WPC Raw Powerlifting World Champion
- Height: 1.91 m (6 ft 3 in)

Competition record

Powerlifting

Representing Latvia

WPC Raw World Powerlifting Championships
3rd	2009	140kg
1st	2011	140kg

WPC Junior World Powerlifting Championships
1st	2002	125kg

GPC World Powerlifting Championships
1st	2003	125kg

Champions Battle Raw Deadlift Challenge
3rd	2010	140kg

Konstantīns Konstantinovs (Russian: Константи́н Константи́нов, June 6, 1978 – October 28, 2018) was a Latvian powerlifter of Russian descent. His raw deadlift of 426 kg (939.2 lb), set in 2009, was the heaviest raw deadlift for the 140 kg (308 lb) weight class until 2022, and to this day remains the heaviest beltless deadlift in the history of powerlifting.

== Early life ==
Konstantinovs started gymnastics at the age of 6 and then learned judo during his school days. Then he started to lift weights in the gym and at the age of 16, started training powerlifting.

== Powerlifting career ==
=== Equipped category ===
Konstantinovs started his Powerlifting career in 1997 competing in single ply equipment, participating at the Latvian Powerlifting Championships. By 2001, he totaled 900 kg (1,984.2 lb) in the 110 kg (242 lb) weight class. He won the 2002 WPC Junior World Powerlifting Championships held in Finland and both 2002 and 2003 GPC World Powerlifting Championships held in Germany and Austria respectively. By this time he was competing in the 125 kg (275 lb) weight class and was totaling 1,041 kg (2,295.0 lb).

During 2005 Latvian Powerlifting Championships, Konstantinovs totaled 1,050 kg (2,314.9 lb) with a 410 kg (903.9 lb) deadlift. In 2006 Latvian Powerlifting Championships, he deadlifted 430 kg (948.0 lb).

=== Raw category ===
Konstantinovs turned into raw powerlifting with 2008 Latvian Bench Press Championships. During 2009 WPC-Latvia Monstergym Open Championship, he competing in the 140 kg (308 lb) weight class for the first time and totaled 1,006 kg (2,217.9 lb) raw with a 426 kg (939.2 lb) beltless raw deadlift.

He finished third at the 2010 Champions Battle Raw Deadlift Challenge held in Arhangelsk, Russia with a 390 kg (859.8 lb) beltless raw deadlift behind 3 time WPC World Champion and 2009 WPC Raw World Champion Andrey Belyaev who deadlifted 380 kg (837.8 lb) in the 100 kg (220 lb) weight class and Strongman and Olympic weightlifter Mikhail Koklyaev who deadlifted 415 kg (914.9 lb) in the super heavy weight class.

During his career, Konstantinovs deadlifted 400 kg (881.8 lb)+ 14 times (10 of them being raw).

== Personal life and death ==
Konstantinovs worked as a professional bodyguard to earn his living.

On October 28, 2018, Konstantinovs died at the age of 40 due to unspecified causes.

== Personal records ==
125 kg (275 lb) weight class, in single-ply equipment

- Squat (w/wraps) – 385 kg (848.8 lb) (2005 Latvian Powerlifting Championships)
- Bench press – 270.5 kg (596.4 lb) (2002 WPC World Championships, Finland)
- Deadlift – 430 kg (948.0 lb) (2006 Latvian Powerlifting Championships)
- Total – 1,050 kg (2,314.9 lb) (385 + 255 + 410 kg (848.8 + 562.2 + 903.9 lb)) (2005 Latvian Powerlifting Championships)

125 kg (275 lb) weight class, raw

- Squat (w/wraps) – 320 kg (705.5 lb) (2009 WPC-Latvia Amateur Latvian Championships)
- Bench press – 265 kg (584.2 lb) (2009 WPC-Latvia Amateur Latvian Championships)
- Deadlift – 400 kg (881.8 lb) (2009 WPC-Latvia Amateur Latvian Championships)
- Total – 985 kg (2,171.6 lb) (320 + 265 + 400 kg (705.5 + 584.2 + 881.8 lb)) (2009 WPC-Latvia Amateur Latvian Championships)

140 kg (308 lb) weight class, raw

- Squat (w/sleeves) – 335 kg (738.5 lb) (2011 Latvian Powerlifting Championships)
- Bench press – 250 kg (551.2 lb) (2009 WPC-Latvia Monstergym Open Championship)
- Deadlift – 426 kg (939.2 lb) (2009 WPC-Latvia Monstergym Open Championship) (World Record)

→ The heaviest beltless deadlift in the history of powerlifting

- Total – 1,006 kg (2,217.9 lb) (330 + 250 + 426 kg (727.5 + 551.2 + 939.2 lb)) (2009 WPC-Latvia Monstergym Open Championship)

→ Former 140 kg (308 lb) weight class "drug-tested" raw world record
