= Tajik State University of Commerce =

University in Tajikistan

Coordinates: 38.5326°N 68.7583°E

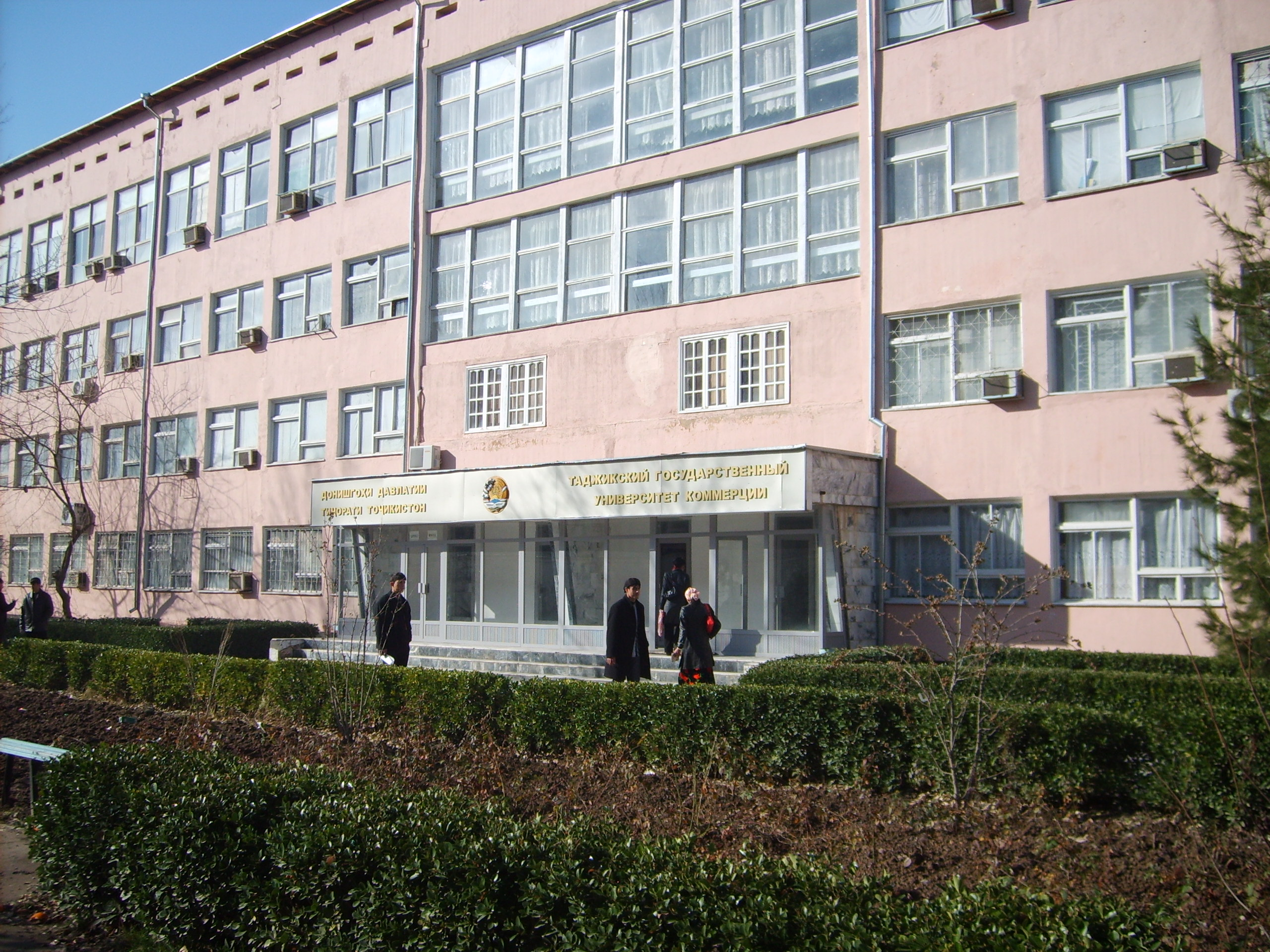

Tajik State University of Commerce (Tajik: Донишгоҳи давлатии тиҷорати Тоҷикистон, romanized: Donishgohi davlatii tijoratii Tojikiston, Russian: Таджикский государственный университет коммерции, romanized: Tadzhikskiy gosudarstvennyy universitet kommertsii) is an economics university located in Dushanbe, Tajikistan.

== Alumni ==
- Bakhtiyor Rahimov
