= Hook grip =

Method of gripping a barbell

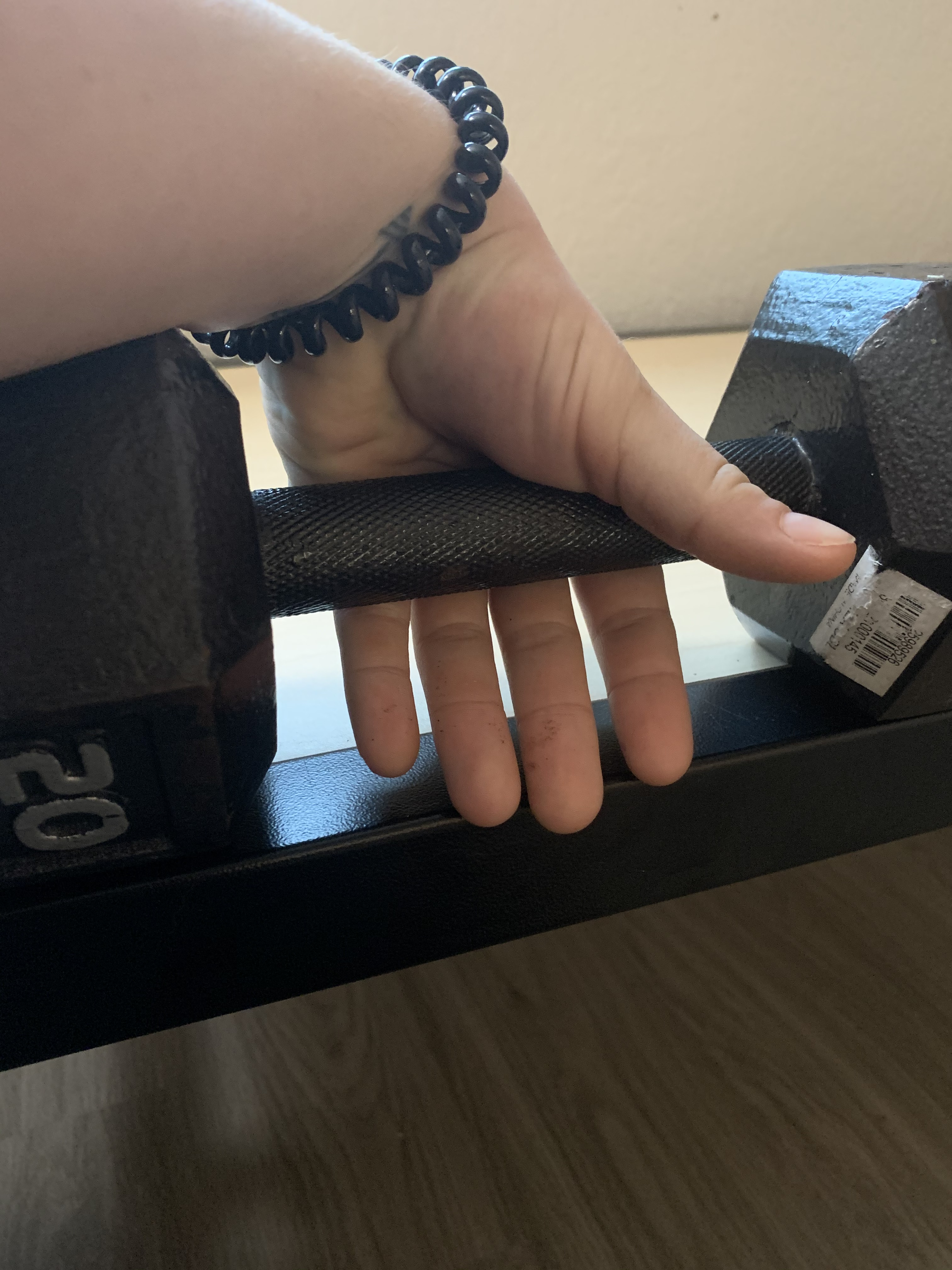
Step one: Place an open hand around the barbell with the thumb on the opposite side

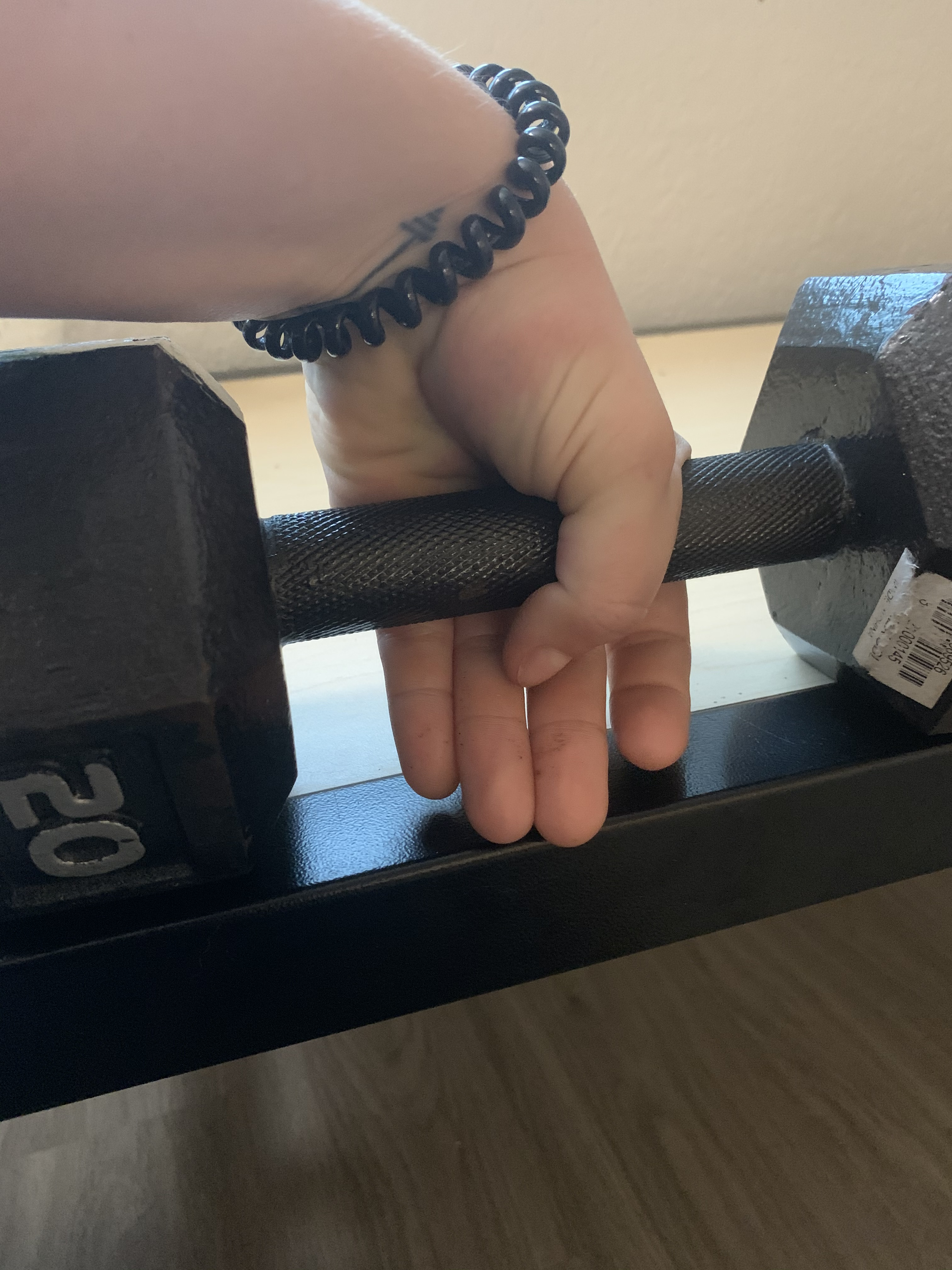
Step two: Wrap the thumb around the barbell

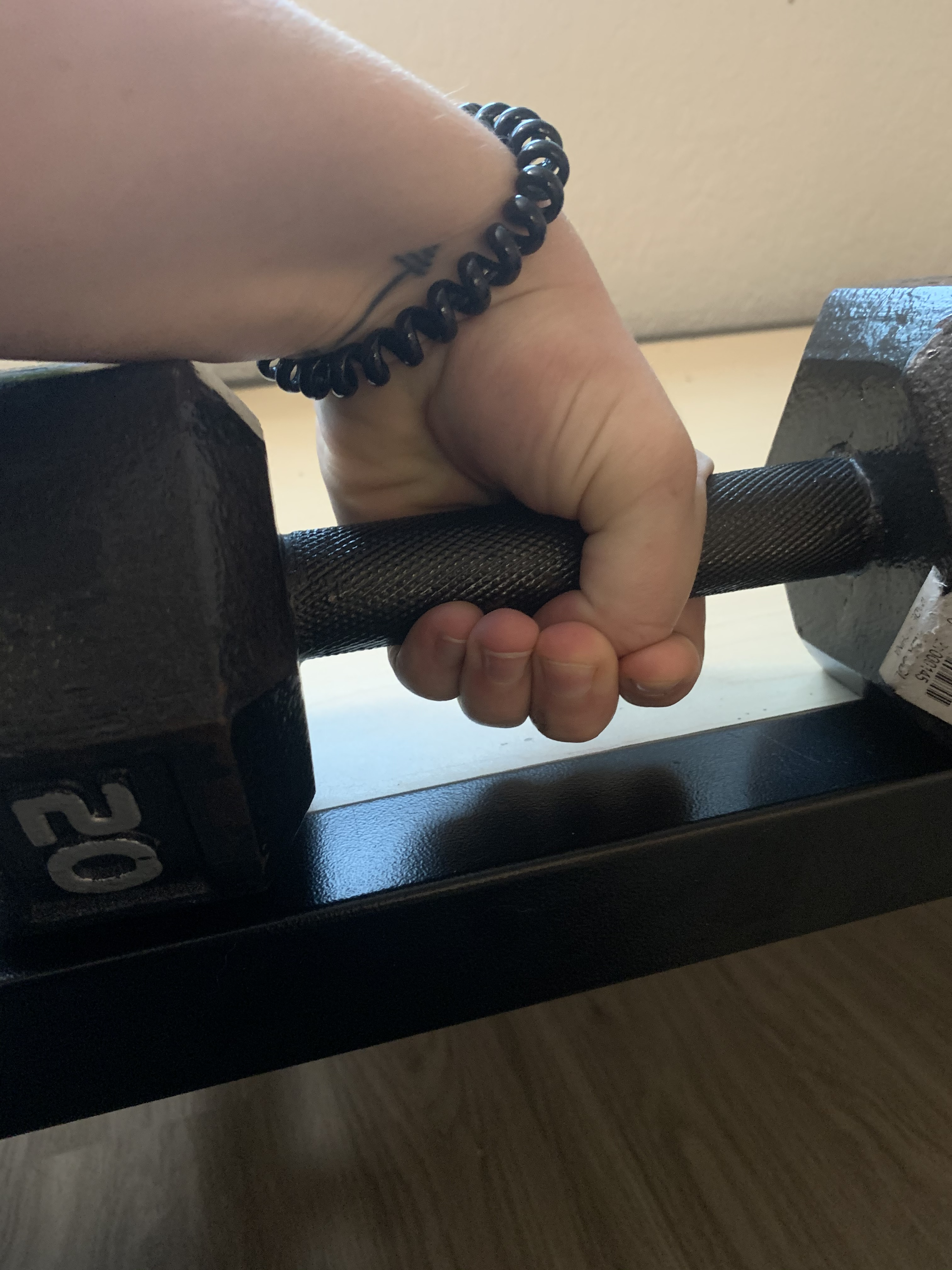
Step three: Wrap remaining fingers over the thumb and around bar

Hook grip is a method of gripping a barbell used in many strength-related sports such as Olympic weightlifting and powerlifting by overlapping the index and middle finger over the thumb. This method of gripping the bar provides a secure bar grip while performing pulling motion with the barbell such as the clean and jerk, snatch, and deadlift. To perform a hook grip one must first wrap their thumb around the bar placing it parallel to the barbell and then wrap their index and middle finger around the outside of the thumb. The pinky and ring finger typically end up resting on the barbell. It is important to actively hook onto the thumb with the index and middle finger while performing a hook grip, compared to providing direct pressure onto the thumb.

A hook grip provides the lifter with a secure, tight grip by maintaining a pronated position between the palms and barbell similar to the double over grip. When used in the deadlift, the hook grip has a number of advantages. Traditionally, lifters tend to use an alternated grip when working with heavy loads on the deadlift; that is, one hand being supine and the other prone. This mixed grip creates an imbalance of the shoulders, with one shoulder being externally rotated and the other internally rotated. Having both hands pronated while pulling the barbell provides the lifter with a symmetrical shoulder position which avoids the imbalance caused by the alternated grip. The imbalanced shoulder rotation, particularly in the spine side of the arm, causes a higher bicep flexion, as well as being more likely to result in bicep tears. This difference in rotation between the shoulders can create imbalances in the muscles of the back over time.

== Advantages ==
- Bar stabilization: the lifter has a more symmetrical pull resulting in a more technically sound lift and more even muscle development. The athlete also has more control over the barbell roll.
- Secure bar grip: with hook grip, athletes can rely less on grip tension and focus more on their strength and technique during their sessions and competitions.

The hook grip is more secure than grips in which the thumb remains outside the other fingers, like the closed grip or the natural grip. During a snatch or clean, the lifter can exert forces up to 2-3 times the weight of the loaded barbell at rest, and the hook grip allows an athlete to maintain a grip on the bar during the phase of highest bar acceleration, the second pull. The hook grip does this by preventing the bar from rolling in the hands, whereas the bar would have a tendency to roll towards the fingertips in a normal overhand grip.

== Disadvantages ==
- Pain: the hook grip may cause pain, especially before the skin and fingers have developed calluses and gotten used to the new pressure they have to endure.
- Skin tears: although there are some techniques to mitigate tears, it is still likely that the thumb skin will rip while acclimating to hook grip.
- Difficult with small hands: if the thumb cannot reach around the barbell due to the barbell size, the hook grip will be difficult to use.

The hook grip places a relatively large amount of pressure on the thumb. As a result, it may cause pain or injury to the skin or thumbnail, although this can be overcome by regular training and gradually working with heavier loads. It generally takes up to 2 weeks to grow accustomed to the hook grip. Many Olympic weightlifters tape their thumbs with athletic tape.

== Pain reduction ==
The following techniques can reduce pain after lifting using the hook grip:

- Submerging the hands in a bucket of water after each session for 5–10 minutes.
- Wrapping elastic tape around the thumbs during training to reduce friction on the skin provides a more secure and less painful grip. Note that traditional athletic tape will hinder the grip's range of motion, so elastic tape is preferable.

== Grip strengthening ==
The below tips can aid hook grip strength:

- Reducing the use of lifting straps by only using them when necessary.
- Performing slow pulling movements such as deadlifts or rows can help develop key muscles to improve performance during more complex movements.
- Using hand grippers a couple of times per week and completing wrist strengthening/stretching exercises before training sessions.
- To train thumb and finger positioning, the hook grip can be practiced using household items such as a broomstick, steering wheel, or bottleneck.
  Hook grip in motion
