= Tamara Walcott =

American powerlifter

Tamara Walcott (born December 4, 1983) is a powerlifter and strongwoman from the United States Virgin Islands. Weighing in at 138 kg (304 lb), she started powerlifting in 2018 and after four years in 2022 at American Pro, lifted 735 kg (1,620 lb) in sleeves, breaking April Mathis' 11-years standing 730.5 kg (1,610 lb) world record and establishing the heaviest raw powerlifting total of all-time by a woman.

During the 2022 Arnold Strongwoman Classic, she also set the world record for the heaviest Elephant bar Deadlift by a woman, lifting 290.5 kg (641 lb) (raw). Unlike her fellow competitors, she did it without using lifting straps.

== Personal records ==
Powerlifting

- Squat (raw) – 307 kg (677 lb)
- Bench press (raw) – 172.5 kg (380 lb)
- Deadlift (raw) – 297 kg (655 lb) (World Record)

→ she has also done 299.5 kg (660 lb) in training

- Total (raw) – 759 kg (1,673 lb) (World Record)

Strongwoman

- Elephant bar Deadlift (raw) – 295.5 kg (651 lb) (Former World Record)
