= American Powerlifting Federation =

- The American Powerlifting Federation (APF) logo
- Abbreviation: APF
- Formation: 1986
- Type: Sports organization
- Purpose: Powerlifting competition and governance
- Headquarters: Aurora, Illinois, United States
- Region served: United States
- Members: World Powerlifting Congress (WPC)
- President: Amy Jackson
- Website: worldpowerliftingcongress.com

The American Powerlifting Federation (APF) is a national powerlifting organization in the United States, serving as the U.S. affiliate of the World Powerlifting Congress (WPC). It organizes competitions in both equipped and raw (unequipped) powerlifting, including full power (squat, bench press, deadlift) and single-lift events across various age and weight classes. The APF operates alongside its drug-tested division, the Amateur American Powerlifting Federation (AAPF), which enforces strict anti-doping policies.

== History ==
The APF was established in 1986 as the U.S. affiliate of the WPC, founded by powerlifter Ernie Frantz to promote powerlifting with fewer equipment restrictions compared to other federations. In 1997, the APF created the AAPF to provide a drug-tested competitive platform, aligning with the WPC's Amateur World Powerlifting Congress (AWPC) launched in 1999. The APF has since sanctioned competitions ranging from local meets to national championships, accommodating both equipped and raw divisions. Following Frantz's death in 2012, Amy Jackson assumed the presidency, with governance by a board of directors.

== Amateur American Powerlifting Federation (AAPF) ==
The AAPF, formed in 1997, is the drug-tested arm of the APF, requiring athletes to undergo random and out-of-competition drug testing to ensure fair competition. It hosts events in raw and equipped categories and serves as the qualifying body for AWPC international competitions. The AAPF also supports youth and high school powerlifting, emphasizing anti-doping education. Notable AAPF records include Vincent Falzetta's 652.5 kg total in the men's 67.5 kg open class (2017, Lisle, Illinois) and Lindsey Cardinal's 472.5 kg total in the women's 82.5 kg class (2016, Sycamore, Illinois).

== National championships ==
The APF organizes annual national championships, typically held in June or July, with locations varying across the United States. These events cover equipped, raw, and single-lift competitions for open, junior, master, and other divisions. Qualifying meets at the state level feed into the nationals, which have been held since the late 1980s. Notable past events include the 2012 APF Senior Nationals (June 1–3) and the 2013 APF-AAPF Illinois State Meet (March 23–24, Chicago). The AAPF Nationals, such as those in Lombard, Illinois (2021–2024), serve as qualifiers for AWPC world events. Records from these meets are maintained on the WPC website.

== World Powerlifting Congress affiliation ==
As the WPC's U.S. affiliate, the APF facilitates participation in international competitions, including the WPC World Championships and AWPC drug-tested worlds. The WPC, established in 1986, hosts annual global events, such as the 2025 AWPC/WPC World Cup in Egypt (February 1–6) and the Eurasia Cup in Kazakhstan (April). The APF and AAPF align with WPC rules, which permit multi-ply gear in equipped divisions and raw lifting with optional knee wraps.

== Records ==
The APF and AAPF maintain separate records for raw, classic (knee wraps allowed), and equipped divisions across weight classes and age groups. Key records include:

- APF Raw Full Power: Men's highest total of 982.5 kg by Brian Siders (140+ kg, 2011, Atlanta); women's highest of 727.5 kg by April Mathis (110+ kg, 2011, Orlando).
- AAPF Classic Full Power: Men's highest total of 922.5 kg by Tyrel Williams (140+ kg, 2017, Lisle, Illinois); women's highest of 592.5 kg by Sheena Reed (110+ kg, 2023, Baton Rouge, Louisiana).
- AAPF Raw Full Power: Men's highest total of 907.5 kg by Stephen Coleman (140 kg, 2017, Lancaster, South Carolina); women's highest of 472.5 kg by Lindsey Cardinal (82.5 kg, 2016, Sycamore, Illinois).

Detailed records are published on the WPC website.

== Notable lifters ==
Several powerlifters have achieved recognition in APF and AAPF competitions:

- Zahir Khudayarov: Competed in APF/WPC events, known for raw squat records, including 480 kg in the 125 kg class.
- Daniel Bell: Recorded totals exceeding 1,100 kg in equipped superheavyweight divisions in WPC competitions.
- Andy Huang: Set APF raw record with 952.5 kg total in the 125 kg class (2016, Lombard, Illinois).
- Scot Mendelson: Known for equipped bench press records over 400 kg in early APF/WPC meets.
- Julius Maddox: Competed in APF events, later setting raw bench press records exceeding 350 kg.
