= Deadlift =

Weight training exercise

The deadlift is a strength training exercise in which a weight is lifted off the ground to hip level and then returned to the floor. While traditionally done with a barbell, deadlifts can also be done with dumbbells, kettlebells, trap bars, or resistance bands. It is one of the three powerlifting movements along with the squat and bench press, as well as a quintessential lift in strongman. The all-time deadlift world record stands at 510 kg (1,124.36 lb), achieved by Iceland's Hafþór Júlíus Björnsson.

Deadlift phases

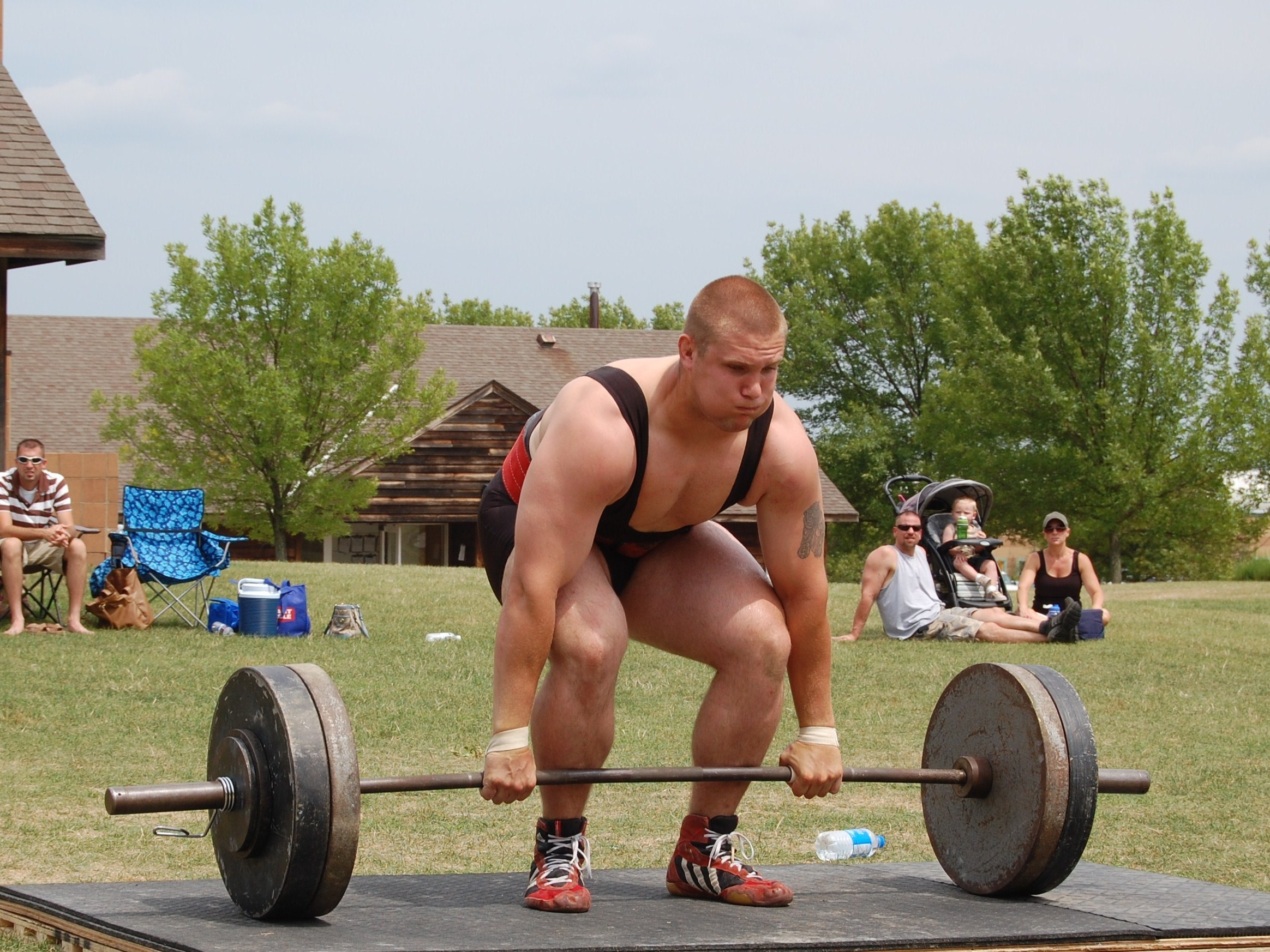
Phase 1

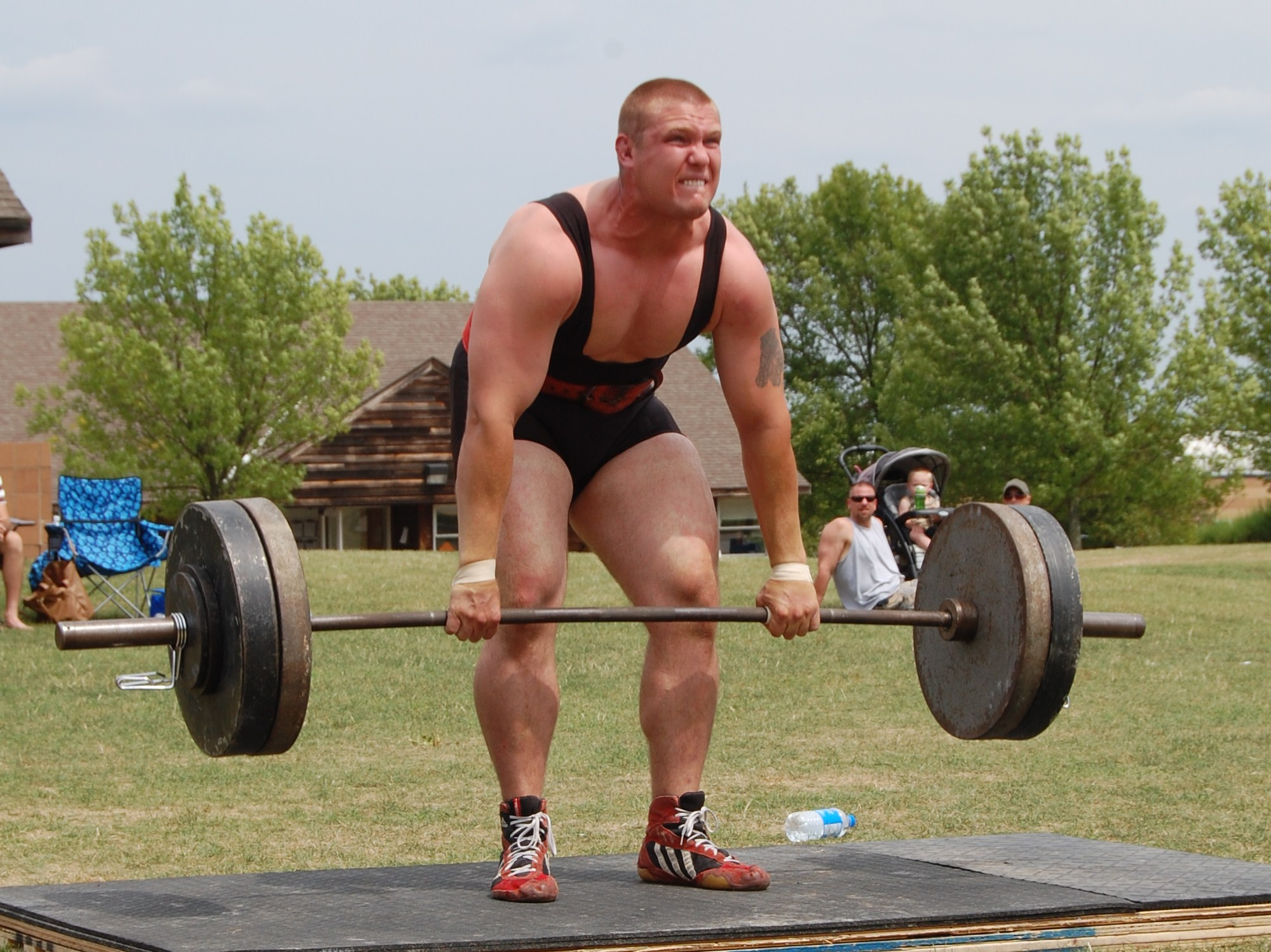
Phase 2

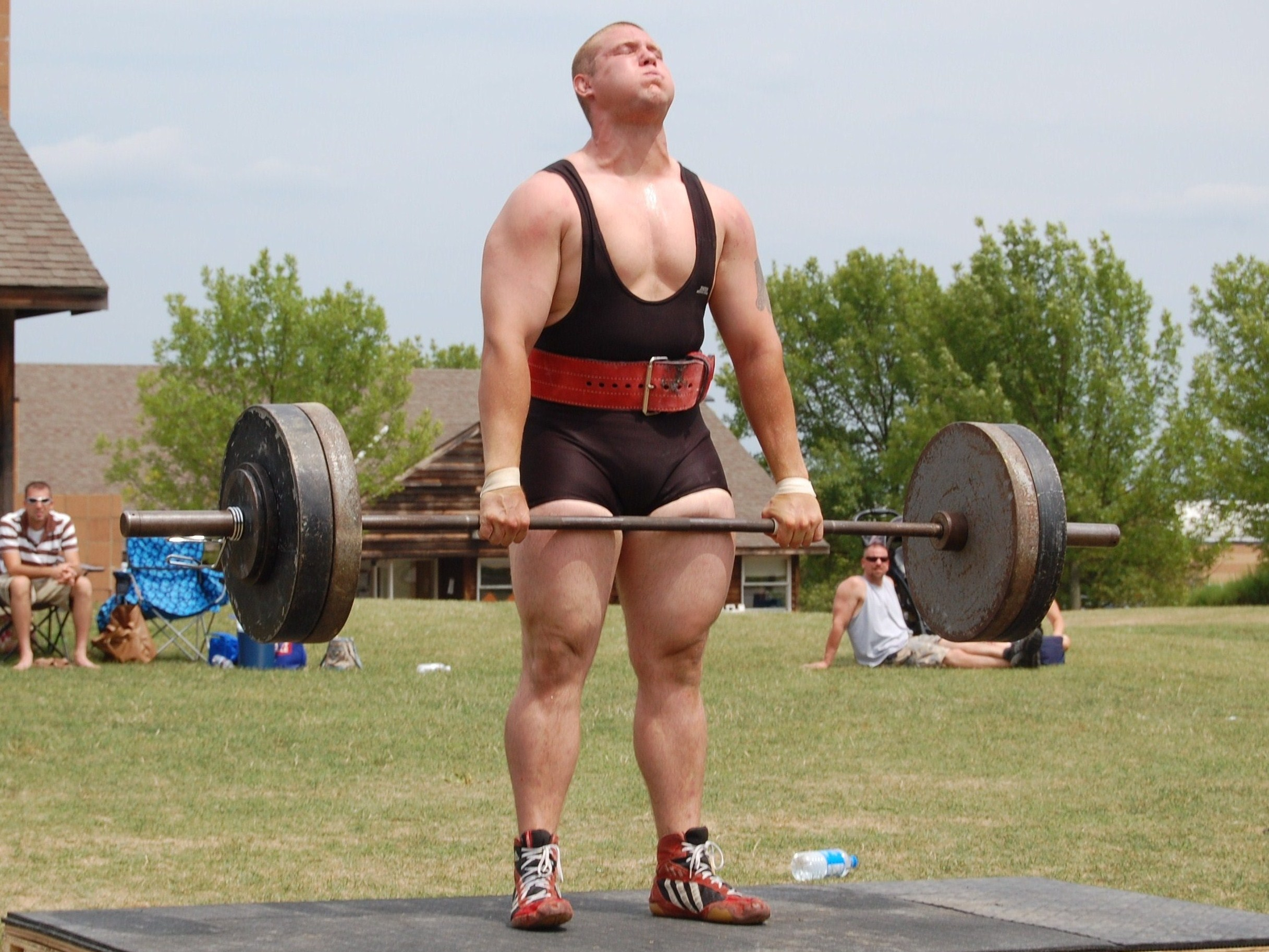
Phase 3

Two styles of deadlift are commonly used in competition settings: the conventional deadlift and the sumo deadlift. While both of these styles are permitted under the rules of powerlifting, only the conventional stance is permitted in strongman.

== Execution ==
=== Form ===
The conventional deadlift can be broken down into three phases: the setup, the initial pull or drive, and the lockout.

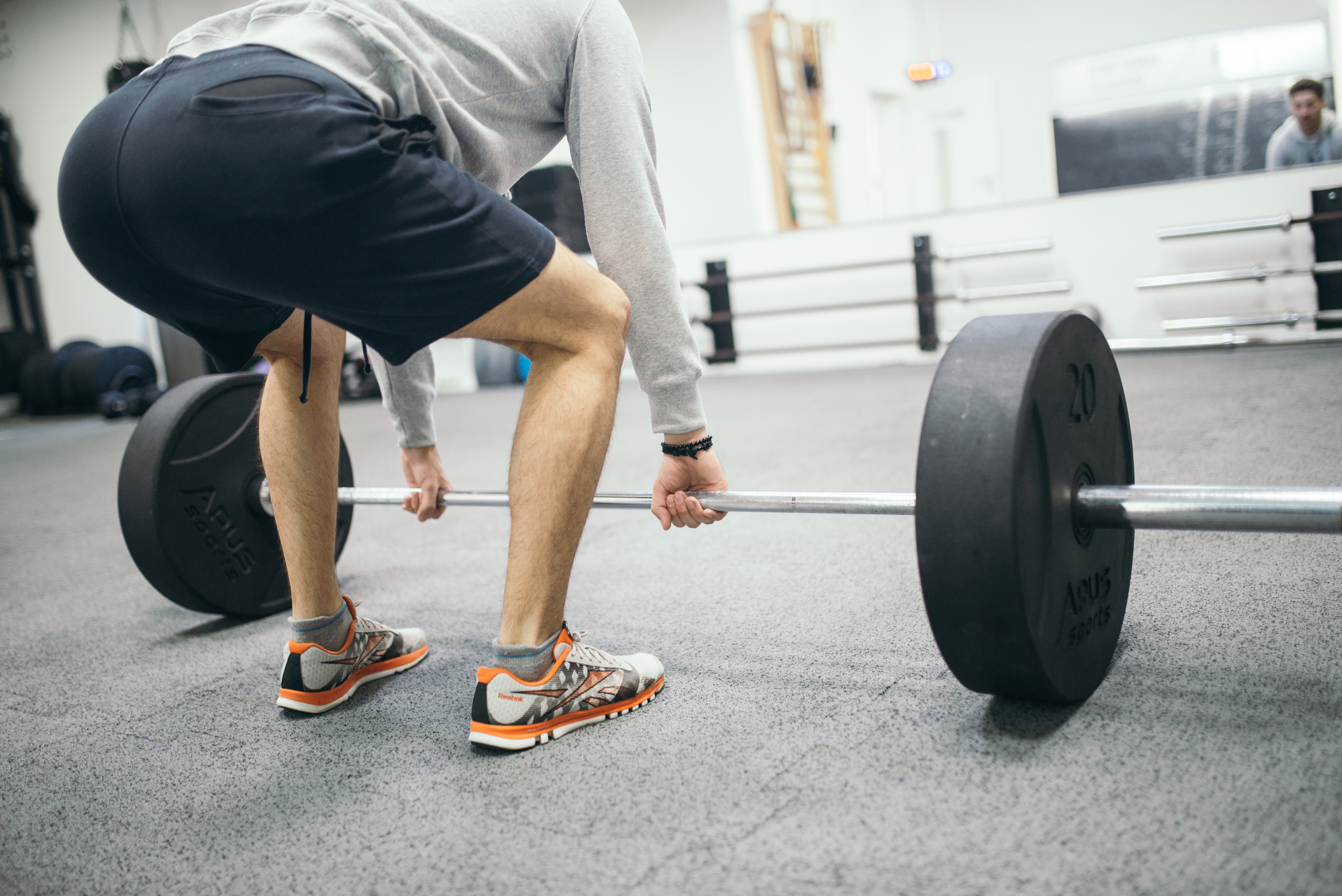
A man positioning himself to perform the deadlift

Setup: When performing a deadlift, a lifter sets in a position that eccentrically loads the gluteus maximus, gluteus minimus, trapezius, biceps femoris, semitendinosus and semimembranosus while the muscles of the lumbar contract isometrically in an effort to stabilize the spine.

- The lifter sets behind the bar with it nearly touching the legs (roughly 1 inch away from the shin), with feet pointed forward.
- Then they hinge at the hips and bend the knees, maintaining flat feet, allowing the shins to move forward to touch the barbell but not push it away.
- The lifter grips the bar outside of the legs, roughly at shoulder width.
- Next they raise the chest to position to maintain a neutral spine throughout the lift.
- Then they pull the slack out of the barbell.

Drive: The next section of the deadlift produces the greatest amount of force. By pushing down through their heels while simultaneously pushing up and forward with their hips and maintaining a depressed scapula and a long tense spine, an individual can remain safe during this motion. This is considered the most difficult part of the entire movement due to the amount of work required to drive the bar off the ground.

- The lifter takes a deep diaphragmatic breath and holds it in during the movement, creating an outward pressure on the core to further stabilize the lumbopelvic hip complex and core throughout the motion.
- They keep the muscles of the back contracted tightly in order to maintain a neutral spine throughout the motion.
- Then they drive up and forward with the hips and legs to stand erect.

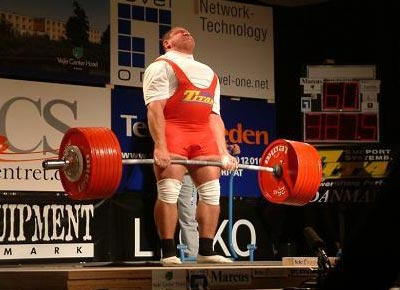
A powerlifter locking out a deadlift

Lockout: The finish is the most critical aspect of the motion. This requires being totally erect with a neutral spine and forceful hip extension to engage the muscles of the lumbar spine and abdomen in unison with the glutes.

- The lifter drives the hips completely into the bar.
- Then they contract the glutei and the rectus abdominis to finish the movement with the pelvis in a neutral position. Contracting the glutes as well as the abdominal muscles is critical for lower back health and safety.

Lowering the weight: Simply, performing the above steps in reverse order. As the muscles of the back and core must remain tight throughout the motion, one should simply hinge at the hips and knees to bring the weight down in powerlifting. However in Strongman, it is not mandatory to lower the weight in such form.

=== Bars and weights ===
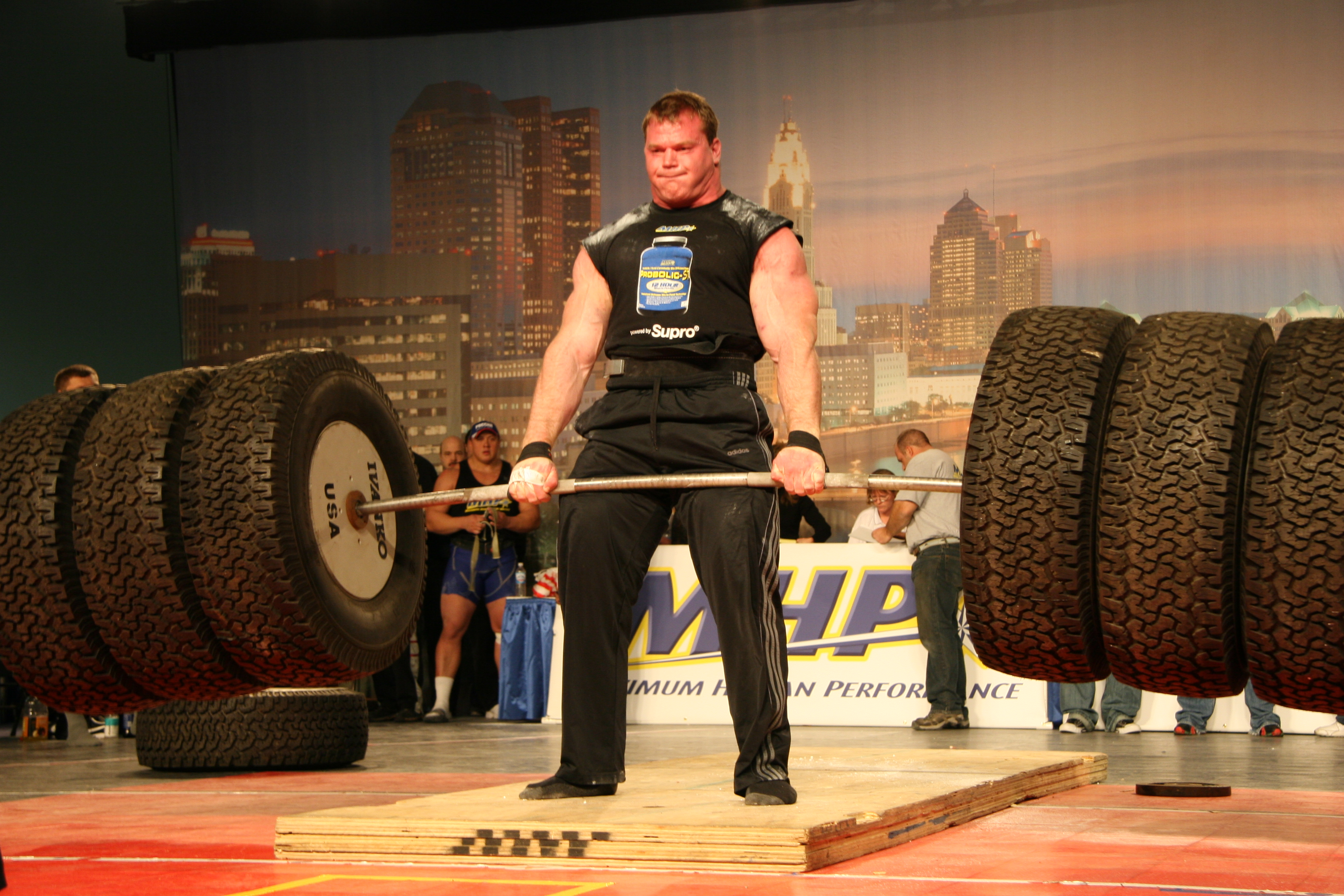
A strongman performing a deadlift using an elongated barbell and tires as weights

Deadlifts can be performed using barbells (including standard deadlift bars such as Texas power bar and Ohio power bar, stiff bars such as S-cubed bar and Axle bar, and long bars such as Elephant bar and Kratos bar) loaded with standard plates or other odd implements such as tires. Whenever standard 45 lb or 20 kg plates are used, the bar is situated exactly 9 inches above the floor. Deadlifts can also be performed using dumbbells, or kettlebells either with both arms or occasionally with one arm, and similarly with both or only one leg. Other variations include side handled deadlift or suitcase deadlift, elevated deadlifts or rack pulls, deficit deadlift or deadlift from a platform, paused deadlift and deadlift static hold.

Each of these variations is called for to address specific weaknesses in a lifter's overall deadlift. For instance, if the lifter has difficulty breaking contact at max weight, deficit deadlifts are performed to strengthen the gluteus maximus and hamstrings due to the greater range of motion required by standing on a platform. On the other hand, if the lifter has difficulty locking out, rack pulls are performed to strengthen the upper back, posterior deltoids, and trapezius.

Chains and resistance bands can also be attached to either end of the barbell in order to increase or decrease resistance at different phases of the lift, for a 'variable resistance deadlift'.

=== Assistive equipment in competition ===
In powerlifting, there is a distinction between raw and equipped lifting, with different equipment permitted in each category. Weightlifting belts are permitted in both categories, and provide assistance by allowing the athlete to achieve higher intra-abdominal pressure. For the deadlift, athletes in equipped competitions use deadlift suits or briefs, which are elastic articles of clothing that store energy as the lifter bends down, and release it as they perform the lift. Equipped lifting distinguishes between single (one layer) and multi-ply (two or more layers) equipment, where multi-ply suits offer more assistance.

In strongman, competitions may allow deadlift suits or briefs. Unlike powerlifting, where straps are not permitted in any category, most strongman competitions allow straps, which can help athletes for whom grip is a limiting factor. Standard figure 6 straps are allowed in most strongman competitions while figure 8 straps are also allowed in some competitions. The latter allows the lifter to hold the bar in their fingertips and can reduce the distance traveled by over one inch (2.5 cm).

=== Grips ===
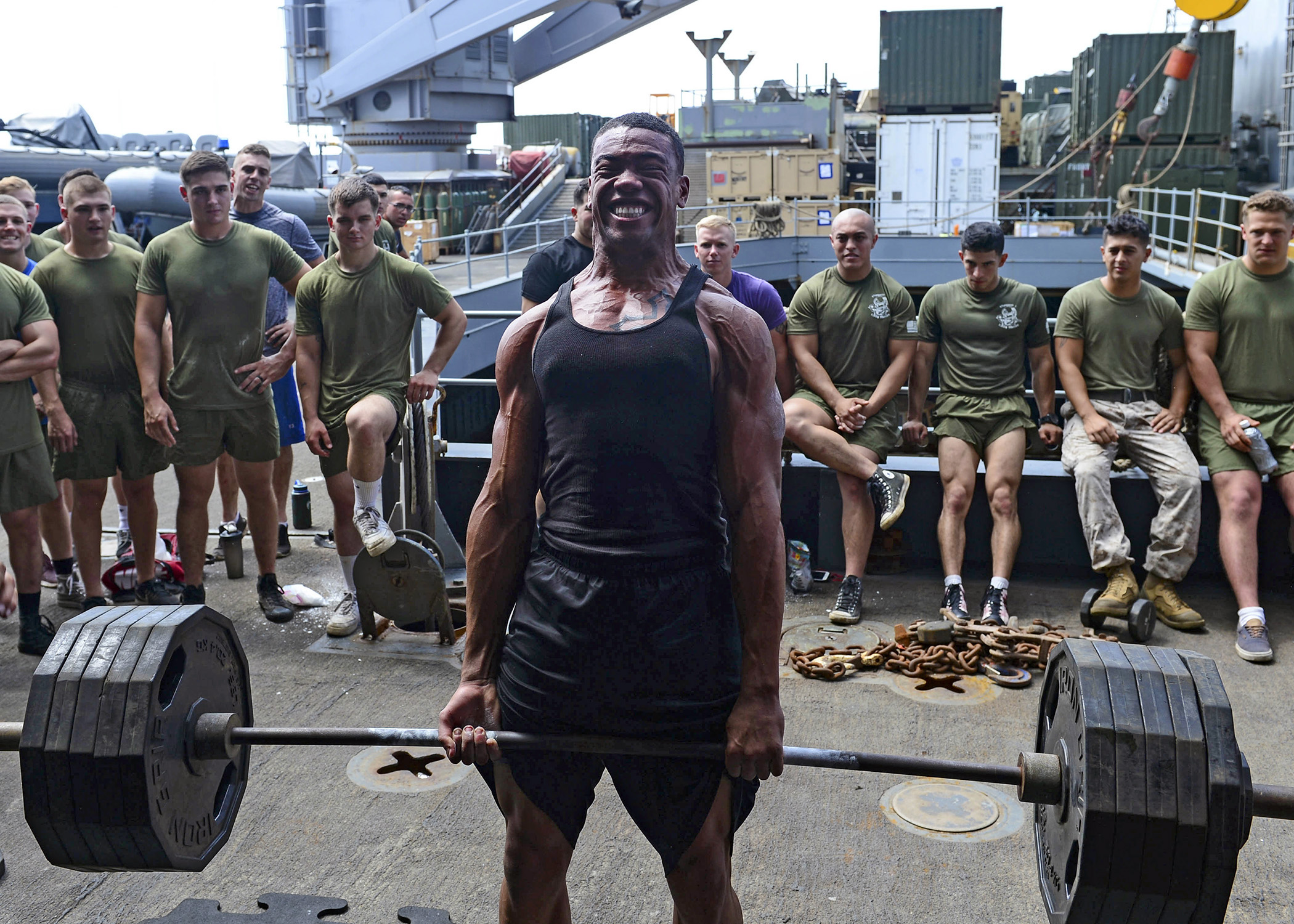
A sailor deadlifting using a mixed/alternating grip

Typically, there are three grips used: overhand (pronated) grip, a mixed overhand-underhand (supinated) (sometimes called "alternating", "mixed", "offset" or "staggered" ) grip, or hook grip. Of the three, double overhand provides the least friction, making it the weakest. When the flexed fingers open in an overhand grip, the bar rolls, and without any counteracting force, the grip can fail. Mixed grip counteracts this by sandwiching the bar between the hands pressing in opposite directions, allowing friction to be maintained evenly even if the fingers begin to open and preventing it from rolling out of the lifter's hands. Hook grip has both hands pronated as with the overhand grip, but introduces additional friction by trapping the thumb between the bar and forefingers.

Some powerlifters adopt the overhand grip for their lower weight sets and move to the mixed grip to lift larger weights so they can achieve their one rep max. Most Strongman competitors use the overhand grip with the allowed straps.

=== Muscles involved ===
A barbell deadlift is a compound exercise and works the gluteus maximus with further work on the quadriceps femoris, hamstrings, trapezius, lats, and erector spinae. The quadriceps, hamstrings, adductor magnus, and soleus serve as synergists during the exercise. For the powerlifting deadlift (where lifting straps are not allowed), the grip strength is also a decisive factor.

== World records ==
Men:

- Strongman Standard Bar Equipped Deadlift (with m/ply suit & straps) – 511 kg (1,127 lb) by Raul Flores (Mexico) (2026)
- Strongman Standard Bar Equipped Deadlift (with s/ply suit & straps) – 501 kg (1,105 lb) by Hafþór Júlíus Björnsson (Iceland) (2020)
- Strongman Standard Bar Raw Deadlift (no suit & with straps) – 470 kg (1,036 lb) by Trey Mitchell (United States) (2024)
- Strongman Elephant Bar Raw Deadlift (no suit & with straps) – 474.5 kg (1,046 lb) by Hafþór Júlíus Björnsson (Iceland) (2019)
- Powerlifting Standard Bar Raw Deadlift (no suit or straps) – 460.4 kg (1,015 lb) by Benedikt Magnússon (Iceland) (2011)
- Powerlifting Stiff Bar Raw Deadlift (no suit or straps) – 435 kg (959 lb) by Dave Richardson (United Kingdom) (2024)
- Powerlifting Raw Beltless Deadlift (no suit or straps) – 426 kg (939 lb) by Konstantīns Konstantinovs (Latvia) (2009)
- Powerlifting Raw Sumo Deadlift (no suit or straps) – 492.5 kg (1,086 lb) by Colton Engelbrecht (South Africa) (2026)
- Armlifting Axle Bar Raw Deadlift (no suit or straps) – 240 kg (529 lb) by Kirill Sarychev (Russia) (2025)
- Armlifting Saxon Bar Raw Deadlift (no suit or straps) – 142.5 kg (314 lb) by Carl Myerscough (United Kingdom) (2024)
- Strongman (15" Elevated) Hummer Tire Deadlift (with suit & straps) – 549 kg (1,210 lb) by Oleksii Novikov (Ukraine) (2022)
- Strongman (18" Elevated) Silver Dollar Deadlift (with suit & straps) – 580 kg (1,279 lb) by Rauno Heinla (Estonia) (2022)
- Strongman (27" Elevated) Viking Deadlift (with suit & straps) – 670 kg (1,477 lb) by Kelvin de Ruiter (Netherlands) (2020)

Women:

- Strongwoman Standard Bar Equipped Deadlift (with suit & straps) – 325 kg (717 lb) by Lucy Underdown (United Kingdom) (2024)
- Strongwoman Elephant Bar Raw Deadlift (no suit & with straps) – 306.5 kg (676 lb) by Lucy Underdown (United Kingdom) (2025)
- Powerlifting Standard Bar Equipped Deadlift (with suit & no straps) – 315 kg (694 lb) by Becca Swanson (United States) (2005)
- Powerlifting Standard Bar Raw Deadlift (no suit or straps) – 297 kg (655 lb) by Tamara Walcott (United States Virgin Islands) (2025)
- Powerlifting Raw Beltless Deadlift (no suit or straps) – 291.5 kg (643 lb) by Denise Herber (Germany) (2024)
- Powerlifting Standard Bar Raw Sumo Deadlift (no suit or straps) – 297.5 kg (656 lb) by Samantha Rice (United States) (2025)
- Armlifting Axle Bar Raw Deadlift (no suit or straps) – 137.9 kg (304 lb) by Lyudmila Gaiduchenko (Ukraine) (2019)
- Armlifting Saxon Bar Raw Deadlift (no suit or straps) – 83.5 kg (184 lb) by Sarah Chappelow (United States) (2024)
- Strongwoman (15" Elevated) Hummer Tire Deadlift (with suit & straps) – 363 kg (800 lb) by Andrea Thompson (United Kingdom) (2022)

== Other deadlift variations ==
Video of a (partial) deadlift

There are also numerous variations of the standard deadlift.

Partial deadlift/elevated deadlift/rack pull – This is where the range of motion (ROM) of the lift is reduced in order to train a particular part of it. Usually, this involves lifting from a higher starting position. This may be facilitated through the use of blocks or pins in a power rack. When considered in regard to the ROM of a normal deadlift, this means that the lift begins in a higher and stronger phase, (Note: A movement may be considered as having any number of strength phases but usually is considered as having two main phases: a stronger and a weaker. When the movement becomes stronger during the exercise, this is called an ascending strength curve i.e. bench press, squat, deadlift. And when it becomes weaker this is called a descending strength curve i.e. chin ups, upright row, standing lateral raise. Some exercises involve a different pattern of strong-weak-strong. This is called a bell shaped strength curve i.e. bicep curls where there can be a sticking point roughly midway.) avoids a lower and weaker phase, and thereby allows for more weight to be lifted. This can lead to increased strength gains. A partial repetition deadlift may also only involve working in the lower weaker phase, in order to improve the amount if strength that can be applied there and help to overcome any sticking points.

Single leg deadlift – This is a deadlift where one foot is on the ground and the other is raised. The grounded leg is primarily used to lift the weight and power the movement. The raised leg is roughly parallel with the straight grounded leg when the weight is lifted, and moves behind when the weight is lowered and the person bends over. As a unilateral, single leg exercise, it utilises the hips more so than if it was performed in a bilateral manner. It also means that the balance and core stability requirements are increased and this can lead to improvements in this regard.

Romanian deadlift (RDL) – Unlike conventional deadlifts where the barbell starts on the floor, in RDLs, the barbell is lifted from a standing position, and the movement focuses on hinging at the hips while maintaining a slight bend in the knees. The emphasis is on keeping the back flat and engaging the hamstrings and glutes to lift the weight as the hips are pushed back. RDLs are particularly effective for improving hip hinge mechanics, strengthening the hamstrings and glutes, and enhancing overall posterior chain development. They are often used in strength training and sports performance programs to improve functional movement patterns and athletic performance. RDLs can also be performed with implements like dumbbells and kettlebells. This variant was popularized by Romanian weightlifters, one of whom, Nicu Vlad, also coined the name.

B Stance Romanian Deadlift (B-Stance RDL) – A b-stance RDL replicates the movement of a standard RDL and a single leg RDL. Using either a dumbbell or barbell, the weight starts at a standing position and the movement focuses on the hip hinge movement while maintaining a flat back and slight bend at the knees. Taking the standard RDL form, individuals slide one leg back with the front leg holding the most weight and the back leg for stabilization. While not a complete unilateral movement as the supporting leg provides assistance it still targets glutes, hamstrings and erector spine.

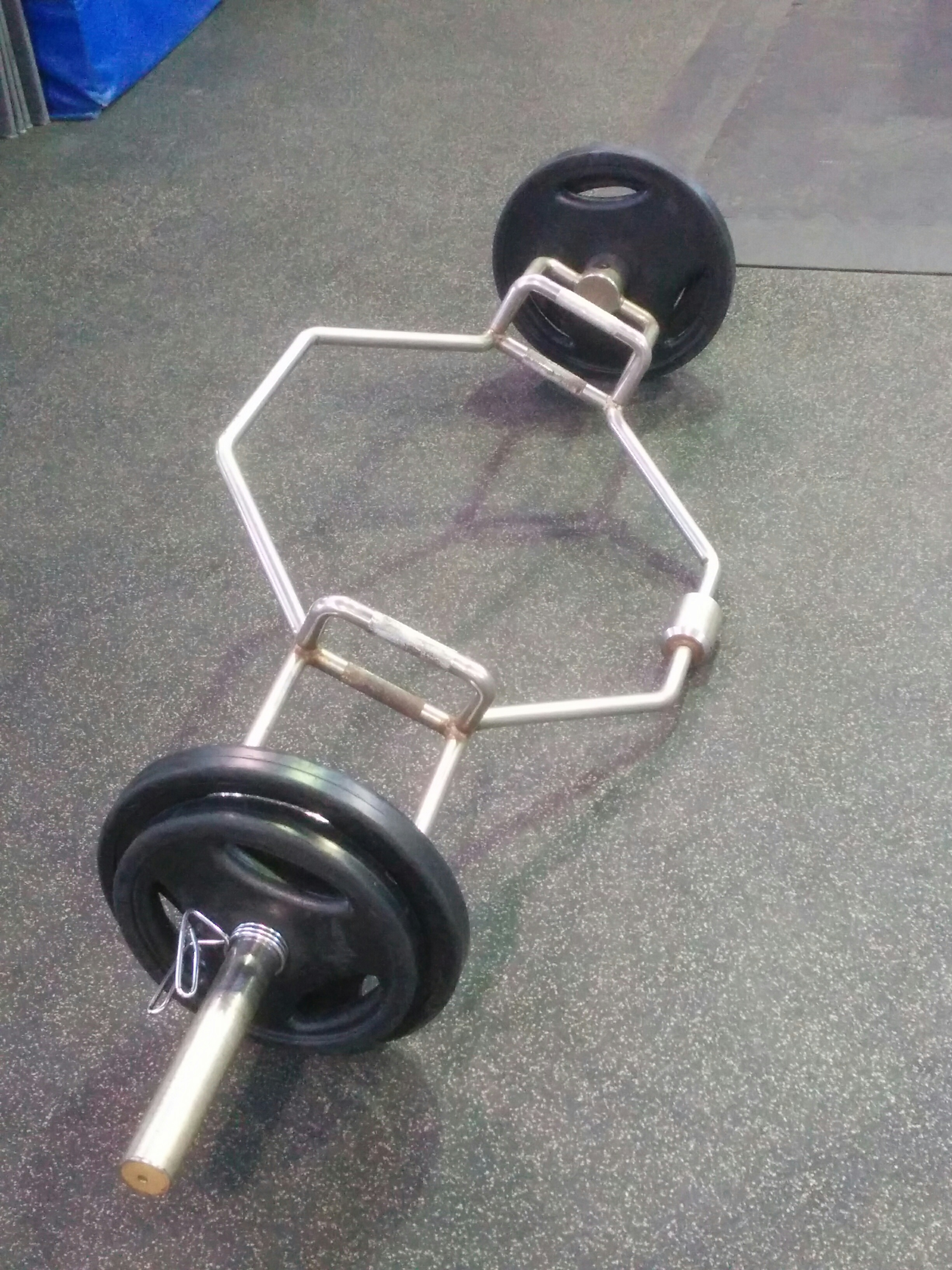
A loaded trap bar. Usually used for deadlifts and shrugs, it may also be used for trap bar jumps.

Trap bar/hex bar deadlift – This involves the use of a trap bar which is a hexagonal or octagonal bar within which the user stands. The handles are positioned at the side, which means that a neutral grip, with the palms of the hand turned inward, can be used. This alters the ROM of the lift and generally makes it less taxing on the lower back and reduces the risk of injury. Usually, there are two pairs of handles with one pair positioned higher, making the lift relatively easier, and the other lower, making the lift relatively harder. The ROM of the trap bar deadlift means that a greater level of power can be generated in comparison to a traditional deadlift or squat. A similar exercise which also involves enhanced levels of power production is the trap bar jump i.e. a vertical jump while holding a trap bar.

Stiff leg deadlift (SLDL) – This emphasizes hamstring development and lower back resilience. Similar to the conventional deadlift setup, it requires standing with feet shoulder-width apart, hinging at the hips. Contrary to its name, the legs are not fully straightened during the movement. Instead, the emphasis lies on minimizing knee bend while pushing the hips back, creating a parallel alignment of the torso to the ground. SLDL reduces quad engagement, intensifies the demand on the lower back, and challenges the hamstrings from a lengthened position. While it may not accommodate heavy loads like standard deadlifts, it serves as a valuable exercise for individuals seeking targeted hamstring engagement and lower back resilience within their routine.

Car deadlift – A movement popularized through Strongman competitions where the front or rear end of a vehicle is lifted using a specially designed leveraged apparatus. Another similar variation is the keg drop deadlift in Strongman where beer kegs are sequentially loaded into a caged platform where the weight progressively increase per each rep. In some occasions, a group of people are also used as the weight.

Pole sports deadlift – The term "deadlift" in pole sports and pole dancing refers to a specific movement that requires lifting the body from a hanging position to a vertical position using strength, primarily from the arms and core, without any momentum.

== Common errors ==
There are a few common errors during the performance of the deadlift. Protracting the shoulders disengages the back muscles which stabilize the spine. Slack should be taken from the bar prior to the lift, by squeezing the back muscles first and straightening the arms; the bar should then be lifted in a smooth motion without jerking. As the objective of a deadlift is to hinge the hips, the knees should not be bent so deeply as to form a squat. If the bar is too far from the lifter, the lifter may compensate by rounding the back or shifting the weight to the front of the foot. Both result in shifting which muscles are used and could cause injury. Rounding the back in general is controversial; it is often recommended that during the lift, the back is flat with a spine neutral. Some lifters prefer to slightly round their back; but an excessively rounded back may result in the load being lifted awkwardly and placing too much stress or pressure on the back, which may lead to injury. The knees should be bent more fully on the descent of the bar to preserve a neutral spine.
