= World Powerlifting Congress =

International sports federation

WPC logo

The World Powerlifting Congress (WPC) is a powerlifting federation hosting meets around the world. The federation hosts competitions which allow multi-ply equipment, but hosted a Raw world championship for the first time in 2009.

The WPC was established in 1986 and has affiliates in 46 countries.

In 1999, the WPC started to host drug tested competitions under the AWPC (Amateur World Powerlifting Congress) banner, with both raw and equipped contests.

The competitive season comes to an end each year in November, as qualified lifters from different countries compete in the annual WPC World Championships.

The United States affiliate for the WPC is the American Powerlifting Federation (APF). The APF has several series of qualifying competitions that allow athletes to advance from the local/state level, to the national level, and then finally to the international level, the WPC/AWPC. The Canadian affiliate is WPC Canadian Powerlifting.

As of 2013, the British affiliate is known as the BPU (British Powerlifting Union), following the BPC (British Powerlifting Committee) losing the WPC license.

== WPC World Championships ==
=== Men ===
WPC world champions

Year	52 kilograms	56 kilograms	60 kilograms	67.5 kilograms	75 kilograms	82.5 kilograms	90 kilograms	100 kilograms	110 kilograms	125 kilograms	140 kilograms	Open
1987	(United States) Mike Nelson	(United States) Ernesto Milian	(United States) John Carr	(United States) Ed Morishima	(United States) Ausby Alexander	(United States) Michael Phillips	(United States) Buddy Duke	(United States) Ed Coan	(United States) Willie Bell	(United States) Bill Nichols		
1988											(South Africa) Gerrit Badenhorst	
1989											(South Africa) Gerrit Badenhorst	
1990		(United States) Peterson	(United States) Doug Heat	(United States) Norm Shackelford	(United States) Joseph McCoy	(United States) Ed Riley	(United States) Mankamyer	(United Kingdom) Mesa	(South Africa) Eugene Van der Merwer	(United States) Brock	(South Africa) Gerrit Badenhorst	(South Africa) Mark Robinson
1996	(United Kingdom) Gary Mellor	(United Kingdom) Steven Grey	(United States) Doug Heath	(South Africa) Andre Fourie	(South Africa) Neville Primich	(United States) Tom Rutigliano	(United States) Jesse Kellum	(Austria) Gerhard Depner	(South Africa) Justin Koenig	(United Kingdom) Lee Marshall	(Austria) Gerhard Holleitner	(United Kingdom) Peter Tregloan
2000		(United States) Ernesto Milian	(Germany) Reno Karkuschke	(Finland) Sakari Selkainaho	(United States) Angelo Berardinelli	(United States) Joseph Dougherty	(United States) Jesse Kellum	(Austria) Gerhard Depner	(United States) Paul Urchick	(Finland) Ano Turtainen	(United Kingdom) Andy Bolton	(United States) Garry Frank
2001			(Finland) Toni Haaperanta	(South Africa) David Ramokadi	(South Africa) Gianfranco Manca	(South Africa) Andries Randall	(South Africa) Bronson Brown	(Austria) Bernhard Schwab	(South Africa) Chris Muller	(Germany) Michael Schrott	(Germany) Uwe Frey	(United Kingdom) Andy Bolton
2002			(Finland) Toni Haaperanta	(Latvia) Vladimir Morozovs	(Sweden) Martin Almqvist	(United States) Ron Palmer	(Finland) Tatu Avola	(Germany) Harald Selsam	(Finland) Jani Ihalainen	(Finland) Ano Turtiainen	(Finland) Niko Laaperi	(United Kingdom) Peter Tregloan
2003		(Germany) Reno Karkuschke			(Finland) Juha Jaakkola	(United States) Sean Baker	(Finland) Tatu Avola	(United States) Benji Hill	(Finland) Jani Ihalainen	(United States) Jason Patrick	(Canada) Allan Meehan	(United States) Brent Mikesell
2004			(United States) Shant Sheklanian	(United States) Charles Morse			(United States) Mike Brown	(Germany) Harald Selsam	(United States) Justin Graalfs	(United States) James Grandick	(United States) James Hoskinson	
2005	(Russia) Igor Arlamyev	(Russia) Oleg Artemyev	(United States) Otis Brown	(Russia) Illya Kokorev	(Russia) Vasily Tevetkov	(Russia) Andrey Sharapov	(Germany) Alexander Matveev	(Finland) Mika Virtanen	(Russia) Maxim Mikhaylov	(Germany) Christian Poppe	(Russia) Artur Stepanov	(Hungary) Tibor Meszaros
2006			(Ukraine) Suradzh Chebotar	(Ukraine) Roman Murygin	(Ukraine) Oleksandr Kutchr	(Russia) Stanislav Pryakhin	(United States) Phillip Delmonti	(United States) Shawn Frankl	(Azerbaijan) Rufat Agaev	(Ukraine) Yevgen Yarymbash	(United States) AJ Roberts	(United States) Chris Clark
2007		(Russia) Aleksandr Onuchin	(Russia) Yevgeny Bagin	(Russia) Mikhail Speranskiy	(Russia) Sergey Ayvazov	(Russia) Maksim Tomchin	(Russia) Andrey Sharapov	(Russia) Andrey Ayvazov	(Iran) Fatemi Mehdi	(Russia) Mikhail Glazunov	(Finland) Ano Turtiainen	(Russia) Igor Nastynov
2008		(Russia) Alexander Onuchin	(Germany) Reno Karkuschke	(Austria) Mattias Schleinzer	(Russia) Illya Kokorev	(United Kingdom) Chris Jenkins	(Ukraine) Serigy Nalyeykin	(United States) Shawn Frankl	(Russia) Sergey Starodubskiy	(United States) Jose Garcia	(United States) Greg Theriot	(United Kingdom) Andy Bolton
2009				(Republic of Ireland) Gerry McNamara	(Russia) Illya Kokorev	(United Kingdom) Lee Cutler	(United Kingdom) Chris Jenkins	(Russia) Andrey Beleyaev	(United Kingdom) Craig Combes	(Russia) Bratanov Vadim	(United Kingdom) Jim Nuttall	(Egypt) Ahmed Hassanin
2010		(Russia) Alizhan Eshchanov		(France) Vincent Eldin	(Russia) Illya Kokorev	(Russia) Dmitriy Khovanskiy	(Belgium) Steve Plonka	(Russia) Andrey Beleyaev	(Finland) Juha Someroja	(United Kingdom) Mark Griffiths	(United Kingdom) Oliver Williamson	(Finland) Kari Kalliola
2011	(Latvia) Mihail Sabarovs		(Israel) Oleg Ivanyukov	(United States) Marc Tejero	(United Kingdom) Gordon Wood	(Russia) Vasiliy Tsvetkov	(Russia) Maksim Piskunov	(Russia) Andrey Belyeav	(Finland) Juha Someroja	(United Kingdom) Craig Coombes	(Portugal) Luis Batista	(Belgium) Philippe Crets

== WPC Raw World Championships ==
The WPC began hosting the WPC Raw World Championships (without the use of single/multi-ply gear) in 2009. The only equipment allowed is a weight belt and wrist wraps.

=== Men ===
Year	56 kilograms	60 kilograms	67.5 kilograms	75 kilograms	82.5 kilograms	90 kilograms	100 kilograms	110 kilograms	125 kilograms	140 kilograms	Open
2009	(Azerbaijan) Asif Beliyev	(Azerbaijan) Elnur Eminov		(Russia) Yevgeny Deckert	(Russia) Sergey Konovalov	(Russia) Alexey Merkulov	(Russia) Rajat dalal	(Russia) Sergey Starodubskiy	(Azerbaijan) Rufat Agaev	(Ukraine) Andriy Grin	(Russia) Valeriy Snigirev
2010			(Canada) Lawson Stratford	(United States) Jason Patch	(Canada) Willie Albert	(Canada) Greg Doucette	(Canada) Jay Nera		(United States) Cody Hyatt	(United States) Brian Connolly	
2011		(Georgia (country)) Georgiy Mikelashvili		(United Kingdom) Kevin Stuart	(Ukraine) Andriy Ivzhenko	(Russia) Aleksey Bazhenov	(Ukraine) Viktor Galaguz	(Russia) Sergey Starodubskiy	(Germany) Michael Schrott	(Latvia) Konstantin Konstantinovs	(Australia) Adrian Tullo

== AWPC Raw World Championships ==
The WPC began hosting the drug tested AWPC Raw World Championships (without the use of single/multi-ply gear) in 2009. The only equipment allowed is a weight belt and wrist wraps. Unlike the WPC, the event is drug tested.

=== Men ===
Year	52 kilograms	56 kilograms	60 kilograms	67.5 kilograms	75 kilograms	82.5 kilograms	90 kilograms	100 kilograms	110 kilograms	125 kilograms	140 kilograms
2009	(Ukraine) Nikita Serenko	(Russia) Oleg Artemyev	(Azerbaijan) Elmir Tarverdiyev	(Ukraine) Leonid Telipaylo	(Russia) Rodion Puchkoviskiy	(Russia) Aleksey Kokukhin	(Ukraine) Nikolay Zhukov	(Ukraine) Vadym Lozhechkin	(Russia) Aleksandr Zaytsev	(Russia) Sergey Lukyanov	(Russia) Oleg Vasyuchenko

== AWPC Classic Raw World Championships ==
The WPC began hosting the drug tested AWPC Classic Raw World Championships (without the use of single/multi-ply gear) wherein the only equipment allowed is a weight belt, knee wraps/knee sleeves and wrist wraps. Unlike the WPC, the event is drug tested.

=== Men ===
Year	52 kilograms	56 kilograms	60 kilograms	67.5 kilograms	75 kilograms	82.5 kilograms	90 kilograms	100 kilograms	110 kilograms	125 kilograms	140 kilograms	140 Kilograms +
2017				(United States) Vincent Falzetta	(United Kingdom) Scott Govier	(United States) Angelo Fortino	(United States) Jonathan Chunn	(United States) TJ Kropp		(United Kingdom) Julian McKerrow	(United States) Tatum Susberry	(United States) Tyrel Williams
2018												
2019				(South Korea) Won Hee Han				(United Kingdom) Jason Berrington	(Russia) Vachagan Baghdagyulyan	(United Kingdom) Julian McKerrow	(United Kingdom) Kane Francis	(United States) Jared Ray
2020			(United States) Dylan Ludwick		(India) Nikhil Bhagat		(United States) Jonathan Chunn		(United States) Justin Perez			
2021		(United States) Dylan Ludwick	(United States) Treijon Johnson		(India) Nikhil Bhagat	(United States) Ryan Staelgraeve	(United States) Dillon Davis	(United States) Alex Issa	(United States) Jeff Oiler	(United States) Justin Perez		

=== Women ===
Year	44 Kilograms	48 Kilograms	52 kilograms	56 kilograms	60 kilograms	67.5 kilograms	75 kilograms	82.5 kilograms	90 kilograms	90 kilograms +
2017			(United States) Briana Maison	(United States) Lindsay Crosby		(United States) Nikki Merson	(United States) Darci Molina	(United States) Tyi Richards	(United States) Samantha Cichy	(United States) Tera Kinnane
2018										
2019				(United States) Gillian Tedeschi			(United Kingdom) Nicola Burroughs	(United States) Robyn Herrick	(United Kingdom) Viv Dickinson	(Canada) Shalynn McCauley
2020		(United States) Brittani Durbin				(United States) Dyan Donofrio				(United States) Katie Murawski
2021					(United States) Erica Corona	(United States) Robin Miller		(United States) Brooke Minuth		
