= Hang clean (weightlifting) =

Type of weightlifting exercise

The hang clean is a weightlifting exercise involving the use of a barbell to do a compound series of strength-building movements.

== Background ==
The hang clean is not typically a competitive lift, but is often used in preparation for certain Olympic lifts such as the clean and jerk. It uses a series of quick movements to create momentum that allows weightlifters to lift more than with traditional isolation exercises. It requires the use of a weight bar and compatible weights. Many experts view this lift as potentially dangerous for inexperienced weightlifters and recommend using lower weights and obtaining proper supervision. When performed correctly, this compound exercise works several different muscle groups, including the quadriceps, back, shoulders, and arms, and can improve coordination.

== Movement ==
=== Starting position: Hanging ===
The first position when performing the hang clean is to assume the hang, or hinge, position. Rather than placing the barbell on the ground, the weightlifter starts with feet hip-width apart, bent at the hips with the barbell hanging just above the knees held in an overhand grip, close to the legs with the chest over the bar. The knees should be slightly bent and not locked. The weightlifter should maintain a flat back and keep the head up.

=== Second position: Extending ===
From the starting position, the weightlifter then should begin the movement by powerfully extending through the hips, knees, and ankles to create an upward momentum. At the same time, the weightlifter should shrug the shoulders toward the ears. As this motion starts to bring the barbell upward, the weightlifter flexes the arms to bend the elbows upward and outward. This creates a vertical trajectory. The weightlifter should focus on keeping most of the weight on the heels to manage this force while pushing the shoulders back. Some people even recommend performing a slight jump for added momentum.

=== Third position: Catching ===
As the bar is propelled upwards, the weightlifter shifts his or her body under the bar to catch the weight using his or her chest. The palms end up facing the ceiling and the weightlifter sinks into a squat position while catching the weight. This is also known as racking the weight. The end of the movement is when the weightlifter stands fully upright, then bends the knees slightly to lower the weight back into the starting position.

== Variants ==
There are a few variations and alternative exercises to the hang clean, including the clean and the power clean. Many athletes use this exercise to prepare for the clean and jerk, which is a competitive weightlifting exercise seen in the Olympics.
