= Aerobic conditioning =

Method for improving the oxidative capacity of the heart, lungs, and skeletal muscles

Aerobic conditioning is the use of continuous, rhythmic movement of large muscle groups to strengthen the heart and lungs (cardiovascular system), as well as changes to the skeletal muscles. Improvement in aerobic conditioning occurs when athletes expose themselves to an increase in oxygen uptake and metabolism, but to keep this level of aerobic conditioning, the athletes must keep or progressively increase their training to increase their aerobic conditioning.

Aerobic conditioning is usually achieved through aerobic exercise such as running, swimming, rowing machine, elliptical, treadmill, cycling, etc. A stronger heart does not pump more blood by beating faster but by beating more efficiently, primarily via increased stroke volume and left ventricular mass. Trained endurance athletes can have resting heart rates as low as a reported 28 beats per minute (Miguel Indurain) or 32 beats per minute (Lance Armstrong), both of whom were professional cyclists at the highest level.

Aerobic conditioning makes the heart and lungs pump blood more efficiently, delivering more oxygen to muscles and organs. Skeletal muscles also become aerobically conditioned, as regular aerobic exercise produces a shift in muscle fibres from more type II (fast twitch/glycolytic) into more type I (slow-twitch/oxidative). Type I muscle fibres have far more mitochondria than type II, making type I fibres the producers of adenosine triphosphate (ATP) primarily through oxidative phosphorylation rather than anaerobic glycolysis.

Some neuromuscular diseases recommend regular aerobic exercise (of varying intensities depending on the disease) in order for the skeletal muscles to become aerobically conditioned, providing symptom relief or slowing the course of the disease, for example metabolic myopathies, Duchenne muscular dystrophy, and idiopathic inflammatory myopathies (IIM).

== History ==
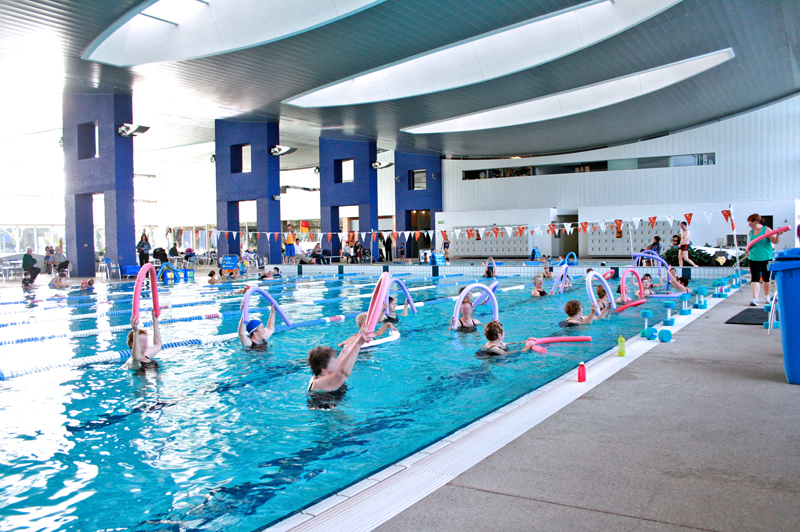
A water aerobics class at an Aquatic Centre

Both the term and the specific exercise method were developed by Dr Kenneth H. Cooper, an exercise physiologist, and Col. Pauline Potts, a physical therapist, both of the United States Air Force. Cooper, an exercise enthusiast, was puzzled about why some people with good muscular strength were prone to perform poorly at activities such as long-distance running, swimming, and bicycling. He began using a bicycle ergometer to measure sustained performance in terms of a person's ability to use oxygen. In 1968, he published Aerobics, which included exercise programs using running, walking, swimming and bicycling. At the time the book was published there was increasing awareness of the need for increased exercise due to widespread weakness and inactivity. Cooper published a mass-market version The New Aerobics in 1979.

Aerobic dancing was invented by Jacki Sorensen in 1969, inspired by Cooper's book. Sorensen began teaching her method and spreading it throughout the U.S. in the hands of hundreds of instructors in the 1970s. At the same time, Judi Missett's Jazzercise was taking off in the form of dance studio franchises in the U.S. Aerobics gained greater popularity, spreading worldwide after the release of Jane Fonda's Workout video in 1982, sparking an industry boom.

== Benefits ==
Aerobic Conditioning has many benefits, including:

- Build stronger bones
- Improve muscle strength, endurance, and flexibility
- Improve balance
- Increase mental function
- Assist in weight management and weight loss
- Reduce risk of developing heart disease, hypertension, stroke or diabetes
- Improve lung function
- Lower blood pressure
- Increase HDL ("good" cholesterol)
- Help to manage blood sugar

== Cardiovascular conditioning ==
Aerobic conditioning trains the heart to be more effective at pumping blood around the body, it does this in a multitude of ways:

- Increasing the stroke volume of the heart (how much blood the heart is pumping per beat)
- Increasing the diameter of the blood vessels, which allows for more blood to move through the body, which in turn allows for more oxygen to diffuse into muscle cells.
- Increasing the size of the heart chambers, enlarging the heart so it can hold and pump more blood.

== Maximum oxygen intake (Vo2) ==
Aerobic conditioning has the ability to raise maximum oxygen intake, meaning that they are able to diffuse more oxygen into their blood than they previously could.

Although exercising at lower intensities improves aerobic conditioning, the most rapid gains are made when exercising close to the anaerobic threshold. This is the intensity at which the heart and lungs can no longer provide adequate oxygen to the working muscles and an oxygen debt begins to accrue; at this point the exercise becomes anaerobic. Aerobic training intensity for most individuals is <85-92% of maximum heart rate.

== Recommendations ==
Aerobic conditioning has many benefits to overall health as it can increase physical endurance and lifespan. Once improvement in aerobic conditioning is apparent, for example in metabolism and oxygen uptake, the body progressively adapts to further training.

Aerobic conditioning can be anywhere from walking on the treadmill to mowing the lawn. The average healthy person should engage in 150–200 minutes of moderate aerobic exercise every week. This amount of physical activity helps with maintaining a healthy weight and protecting the cardiovascular system.

Aerobic conditioning increases the amount of physical activity that the body can endure . It benefits sports performance as well. This type of conditioning can help with heart disease, diabetes, or anxiety. Aerobic conditioning also has many general benefits, such as improving mood, alleviating fatigue and stabilizing sleeping patterns.

== See also ==
- Cardiorespiratory fitness
- Aerobics
