= Aerobic exercise =

Low to high intensity physical exercise

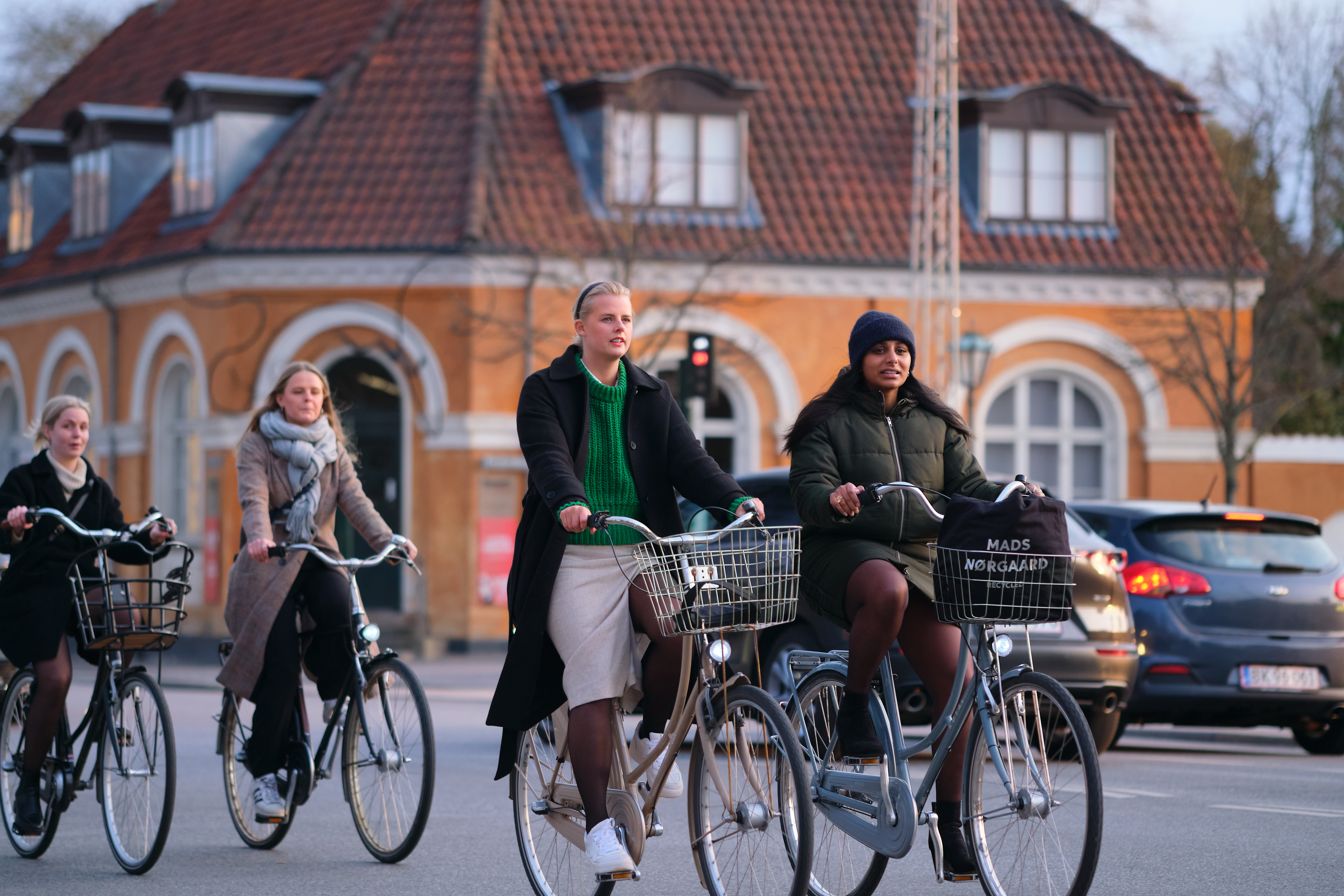
Cycling is an aerobic form of exercise.

Aerobic exercise, also known as cardio, is physical exercise of low to high intensity that depends primarily on the aerobic energy-generating process. "Aerobic" is defined as "relating to, involving, or requiring oxygen", and refers to the use of oxygen to meet energy demands during exercise via aerobic metabolism adequately. Aerobic exercise is performed by repeating sequences of light-to-moderate intensity activities for extended periods of time. According to the World Health Organization, over 31% of adults and 80% of adolescents fail to maintain the recommended levels of physical activity. Examples of cardiovascular or aerobic exercise are medium- to long-distance running or jogging, swimming, cycling, stair climbing and walking.

For reducing the risk of health issues, 2.5 hours of moderate-intensity aerobic exercise per week is recommended. At the same time, even doing an hour and a quarter (11 minutes/day) of exercise can reduce the risk of early death, cardiovascular disease, stroke, and cancer.

Aerobic exercise may be better referred to as "solely aerobic", as it is designed to be low-intensity enough that all carbohydrates are aerobically turned into energy via mitochondrial ATP production. Mitochondria are organelles that rely on oxygen for the metabolism of carbs, proteins, and fats. Aerobic exercise causes a remodeling of mitochondrial cells within the tissues of the liver and heart.

== History ==
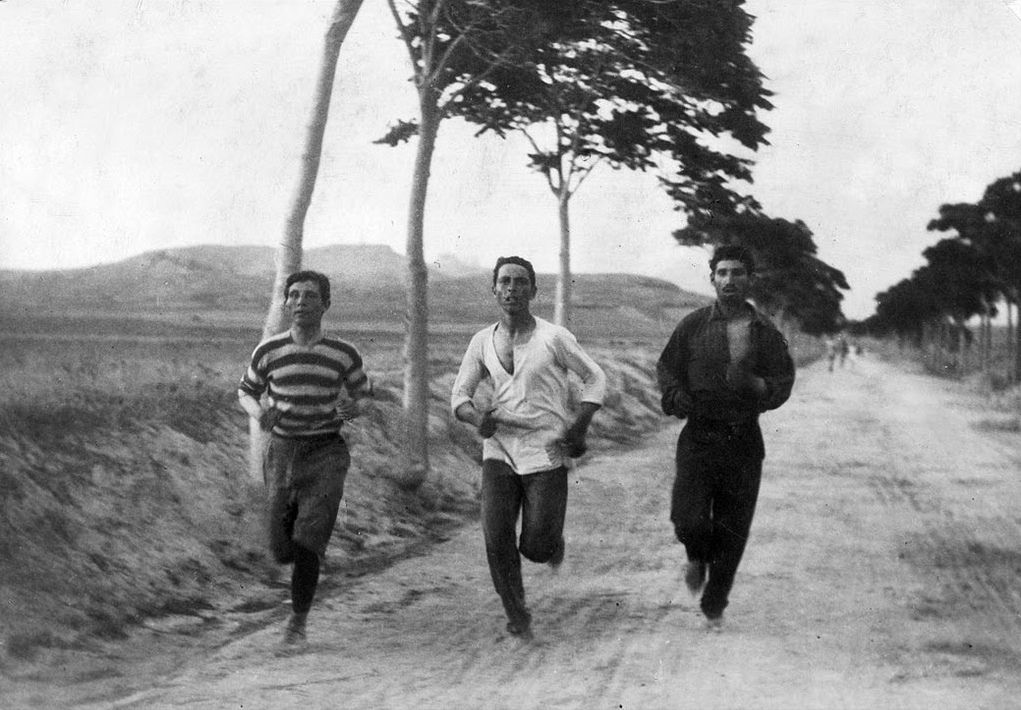
Athletes training for the 1896 Olympic marathon

Archibald Hill, a British physiologist, introduced the concepts of maximal oxygen uptake and oxygen debt in 1922. German physician Otto Meyerhof and Hill shared the 1922 Nobel Prize in Physiology or Medicine for their independent work related to muscle energy metabolism. Building on this work, scientists began measuring oxygen consumption during exercise. Henry Taylor at the University of Minnesota and Swedish scientists Per-Olof Åstrand and Bengt Saltin made notable contributions in the 1950s and 60s. Contributions were also made by the Harvard Fatigue Laboratory, Copenhagen Muscle Research Centre as well as various German universities.

After World War II, health-oriented recreational activities such as jogging became popular. The Royal Canadian Air Force Exercise Plans, developed by Dr. Bill Orban and published in 1961, helped to launch modern fitness culture.

Physical therapists Col. Pauline Potts and Dr. Kenneth H. Cooper, both of the United States Air Force, advocated the concept of aerobic exercise. In the 1960s, Cooper started research into preventive medicine. He conducted the first extensive research on aerobic exercise on over 5,000 U.S. Air Force personnel after becoming intrigued by the belief that exercise can preserve one's health. In 1966 he coined the term "aerobics". Two years later, in 1968, he published a book of the same name. In 1970, he created the Cooper Institute for non-profit research and education devoted to preventive medicine. He published a mass-market version of his book The New Aerobics in 1979. Cooper encouraged millions into becoming active and is now known as the "father of aerobics". Cooper's book inspired Jacki Sorensen to create aerobic dancing exercise routines, which grew in popularity in the 1970s in the U.S., and at the same time, Judi Missett developed and expanded Jazzercise.

In the 1970s, there was a running boom. It was inspired by the Olympics, the New-York marathon and the advent of cushioned shoes.

Aerobics at home became popular worldwide after the release of Jane Fonda's Workout exercise video in 1982. Step aerobics was popular in the 1990s, driven by a step product and program from Reebok shoes.

== Definition ==
Fox and Haskell formula shows the split between aerobic (light orange) and anaerobic (dark orange) exercise and heart rate.

Aerobic exercise comprises innumerable forms. In general, it is performed at a moderate level of intensity over a relatively long period of time. For example, running a long distance at a moderate pace is an aerobic exercise, but sprinting is not. Playing singles tennis, with near-continuous motion, is generally considered aerobic activity, while activities with brief bursts of energetic movement within longer periods of casual movement may not be aerobic. Some sports are thus inherently "aerobic", while other aerobic exercises, such as fartlek training or aerobic dance classes, are designed specifically to improve aerobic capacity and fitness. It is most common for aerobic exercises to involve the leg muscles, primarily or exclusively. There are some exceptions. For example, rowing to distances of 2,000 meters or more is an aerobic sport that exercises several major muscle groups, including those of the legs, abdominals, chest, and arms.

=== Examples ===
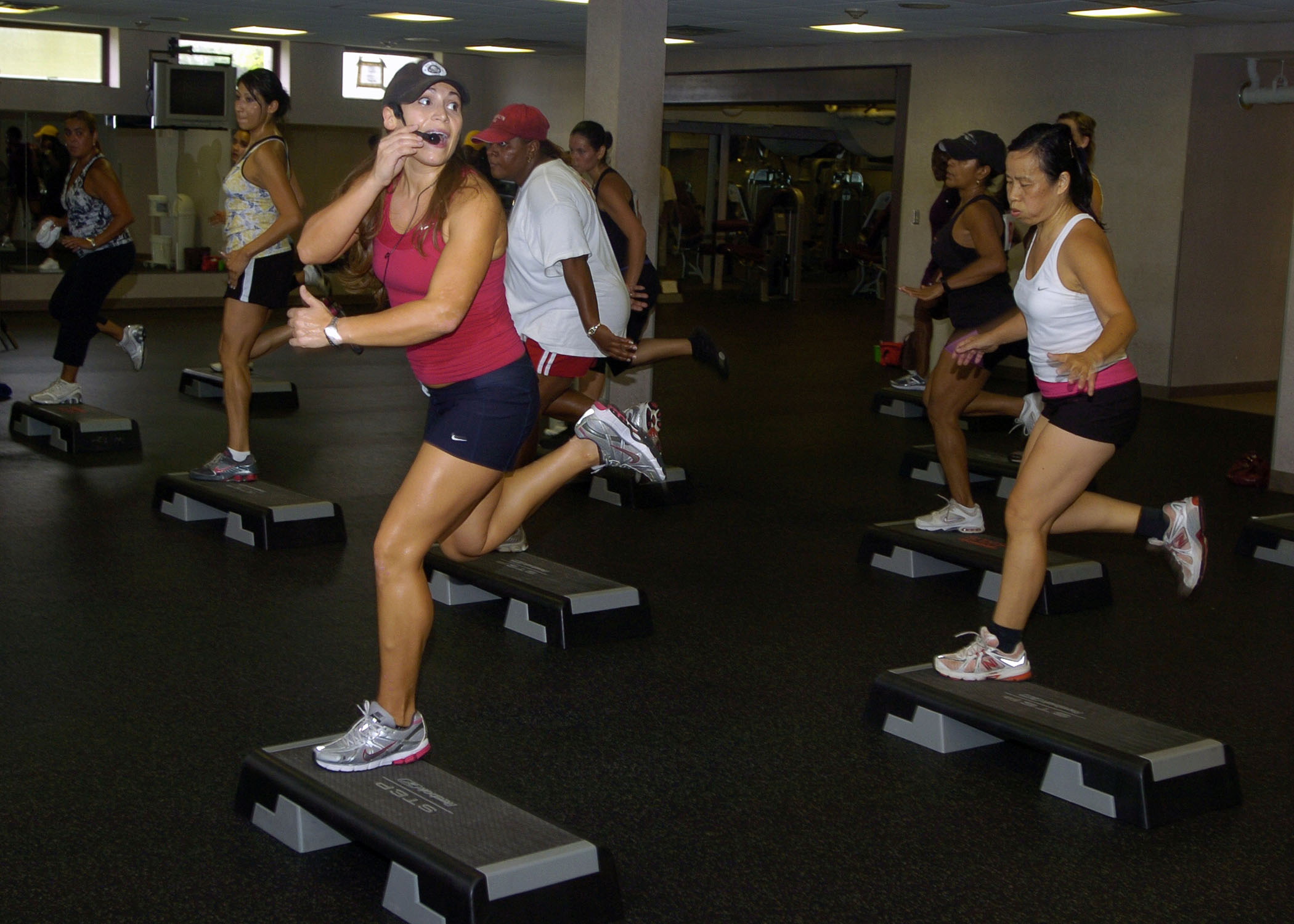
A step aerobics exercise instructor motivates her class to keep up the pace.

Moderate activities

- Swimming
- Dancing
- Hiking on flat ground
- Bicycling at less than 10 miles per hour (16 km/h)
- Moderate walking (about 3.5 miles per hour (5.6 km/h))
- Downhill skiing
- Tennis (doubles)
- Softball
- Gardening
- Light yard work

Vigorous activities

- Brisk walking (about 4.5 miles per hour (7.2 km/h))
- Bicycling at more than 10 miles per hour (16 km/h)
- Hiking uphill
- Cross-country skiing
- Stair climbing
- Soccer
- Jogging
- Jumping rope
- Tennis (singles)
- Basketball
- Heavy yard work
- Elliptical training
- Rowing

=== Versus anaerobic exercise ===
Aerobic exercise and fitness can be contrasted with anaerobic exercise, of which strength training and short-distance running are the most salient examples. The two types of exercise differ by the duration and intensity of muscular contractions involved, as well as by how energy is generated within the muscle. Common kettlebell exercises combine aerobic and anaerobic aspects. Allowing 24 hours of recovery between aerobic and strength exercise leads to greater fitness.

New research on the endocrine functions of contracting muscles has shown that both aerobic and anaerobic exercise promote the secretion of myokines, with attendant benefits including growth of new tissue, tissue repair, and various anti-inflammatory functions, which in turn reduce the risk of developing various inflammatory diseases. Myokine secretion in turn is dependent on the amount of muscle contracted, and the duration and intensity of contraction. As such, both types of exercise produce endocrine benefits.

In almost all conditions, anaerobic exercise is accompanied by aerobic (in the presence of oxygen) exercises because the less efficient anaerobic metabolism must supplement the aerobic system due to energy demands that exceed the aerobic system's capacity. During anaerobic exercise, the body must generate energy through other processes than aerobic metabolism, including glycolysis paired with lactic acid fermentation, and the phosphocreatine system to generate energy in the form of ATP.

=== Fuel usage ===
Depending on the intensity of exercise, the body preferentially utilizes certain fuel forms to meet energy demands. The two main fuel sources for aerobic exercise in the body include fat (in the form of adipose tissue) and glycogen. Amino acids can also be used as a fuel source during aerobic exercise, however in moderate proportions (around 3% of the total energy expenditure during exercise). At lower intensity aerobic exercise, the body preferentially uses fat as its main fuel source for cellular respiration, however as intensity increases the body preferentially uses glycogen stored in the muscles and liver or other carbohydrates, as it is a quicker source of energy. Aerobic exercise at low or moderate intensity is not a very efficient way to lose fat in comparison to high intensity aerobic exercise. Lipolysis (hydrolysis of triglyceride into fatty acids), not fat burning (conversion of fatty acid to carbon dioxide), explains the intensity-dependent fat mass reduction. It has been shown that fatty acid is consumed for wound healing, where moderate intensity exercise does not produce significant damage like high intensity exercise. The size of adipose tissue is determined by the magnitude of nutrient competition from muscle and lungs for cell regeneration and energy replenishment after exercise.

== Health effects ==
Among the possible health benefits of regular aerobic exercise are:

- May improve mood
- Strengthens and enlarges the heart muscle, to improve its pumping efficiency and reduce the resting heart rate, known as aerobic conditioning
- May improve circulation efficiency and reduce blood pressure
- May help maintain independence in later life
- Increases the total number of red blood cells in the body, facilitating transport of oxygen
- Improves mental health, including reducing stress and lowering the risk of depression, as well as increased cognitive capacity. Increases the synthesis of brain-derived neurotrophic factor (BDNF), which is thought to contribute to the cognitive benefits of regular exercise.
- Slightly reduced depression may also be observed, especially if aerobic exercises are used as additional treatment for patients with a hematological malignancy
- Reduces the risk for diabetes (One meta-analysis has shown, from multiple conducted studies, that aerobic exercise does help lower Hb A_{1C}levels for type 2 diabetics.)
- Moderates the risk of death due to cardiovascular problems
- Promotes weight loss
- Reduces the risk of osteoporosis
- May improve episodic memory

== Risks and disadvantages ==
Some drawbacks of aerobic exercise include:

- Overuse injuries of the musculoskeletal system because of repetitive exercise, with young athletes (under the age of 19) particularly at risk
- Overtraining syndrome may lead to persistent dysfunction of a number of body systems
- High volumes of training with insufficient calorie intake puts athletes—particularly female ones—at risk for RED-S
- Aerobic exercise may not be as time-efficient as other cardiovascular training methods. For example, High-intensity interval training (HIIT) has been shown to provide similar benefits in a fraction of the time spent exercising per week.

Both the health benefits and the performance benefits, or "training effect", require that the duration and the frequency of exercise both exceed a certain minimum. Most authorities suggest at least twenty minutes performed at least three times per week.

== Commercialization ==
Aerobic exercise has long been a popular approach to achieving weight loss and physical fitness, often taking a commercial form.

- In the 1970s, Judi Sheppard Missett helped create the market for commercial aerobics with her Jazzercise program, at the same time as Jacki Sorensen was expanding her system of aerobic dancing.
- In the 1980s, Richard Simmons hosted an aerobic exercise show on television, and followed Jane Fonda's lead by releasing a series of exercise videos.
- In the 1990s, Billy Blanks's Tae Bo helped popularize cardio-boxing workouts that incorporated martial arts movements. Reebok shoes popularized step aerobics with their Reebok Step device and training program.

== See also ==
- Aerobics
- Endurance training
- Exercise physiology
- Neurobiological effects of physical exercise
- Music and aerobic exercise performance
