= Aerobics =

Form of physical exercise

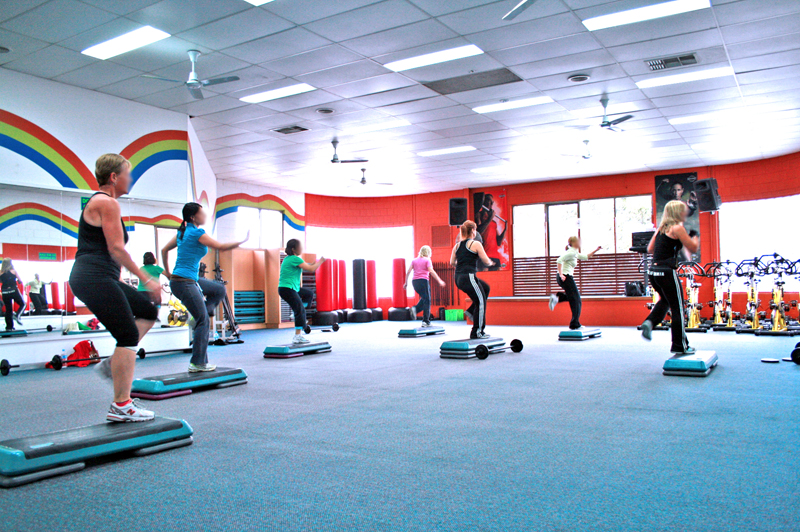
Step aerobics in a gym

Aerobics is a form of physical exercise that combines rhythmic aerobic exercise with stretching and strength training routines with the goal of improving all elements of fitness (flexibility, muscular strength, and cardio-vascular fitness). It is usually performed to music and may be practiced in a group setting led by an instructor (fitness professional). With the goal of preventing illness and promoting physical fitness, practitioners perform various routines. Formal aerobics classes are divided into different levels of intensity and complexity and will have five components: warm-up (5–10 minutes), cardiovascular conditioning (25–30 minutes), muscular strength and conditioning (10–15 minutes), cool-down (5–8 minutes) and stretching and flexibility (5–8 minutes). Aerobics classes may allow participants to select their level of participation according to their fitness level. Many gyms offer different types of aerobic classes. Each class is designed for a certain level of experience and taught by a certified instructor with a specialty area related to their particular class.

== History ==
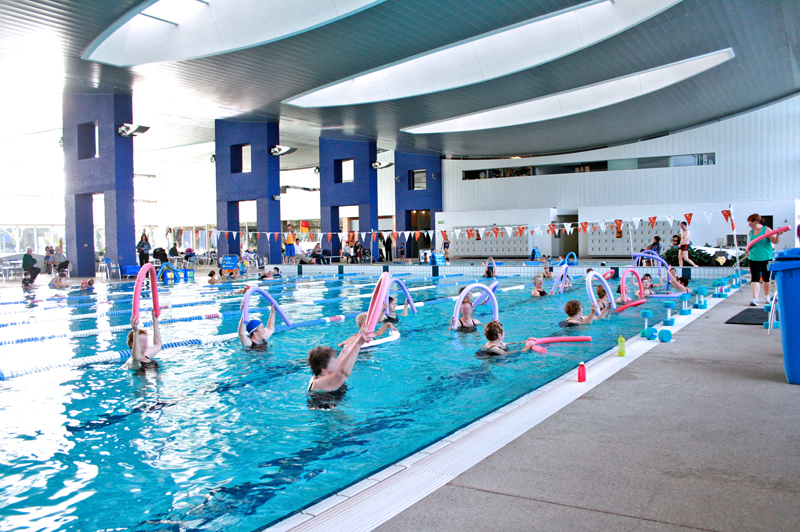
A water aerobics class at an Aquatic Centre

Both the term and the specific exercise method were developed by Dr Kenneth H. Cooper, an exercise physiologist, and Col. Pauline Potts, a physical therapist, both of the United States Air Force. Cooper, an exercise enthusiast, was puzzled about why some people with good muscular strength were prone to perform poorly at activities such as long-distance running, swimming, and bicycling. He began using a bicycle ergometer to measure sustained performance in terms of a person's ability to use oxygen. In 1968, he published Aerobics, which included exercise programs using running, walking, swimming and bicycling. At the time the book was published there was increasing awareness of the need for increased exercise due to widespread weakness and inactivity. Cooper published a mass-market version The New Aerobics in 1979.

Aerobic dancing was invented by Jacki Sorensen in 1969, inspired by Cooper's book. Sorensen began teaching her method and spreading it throughout the U.S. in the hands of hundreds of instructors in the 1970s. At the same time, Judi Missett's Jazzercise was taking off in the form of dance studio franchises in the U.S. Aerobics gained greater popularity, spreading worldwide after the release of Jane Fonda's Workout video in 1982, sparking an industry boom.

== Step aerobics ==
Step aerobics is a form of aerobic exercise that uses a low elevated platform, the step, of height tailored to individual needs by inserting risers. Step aerobics classes are offered at many gyms.

Step aerobics was developed independently by a few American exercise instructors working separately in the mid-1980s, especially Gin Miller and Connie Collins Williams in Atlanta, and Cathe Friedrich in New Jersey. Shoe manufacturer Reebok popularized the exercise method, selling a plastic step unit starting in 1990.

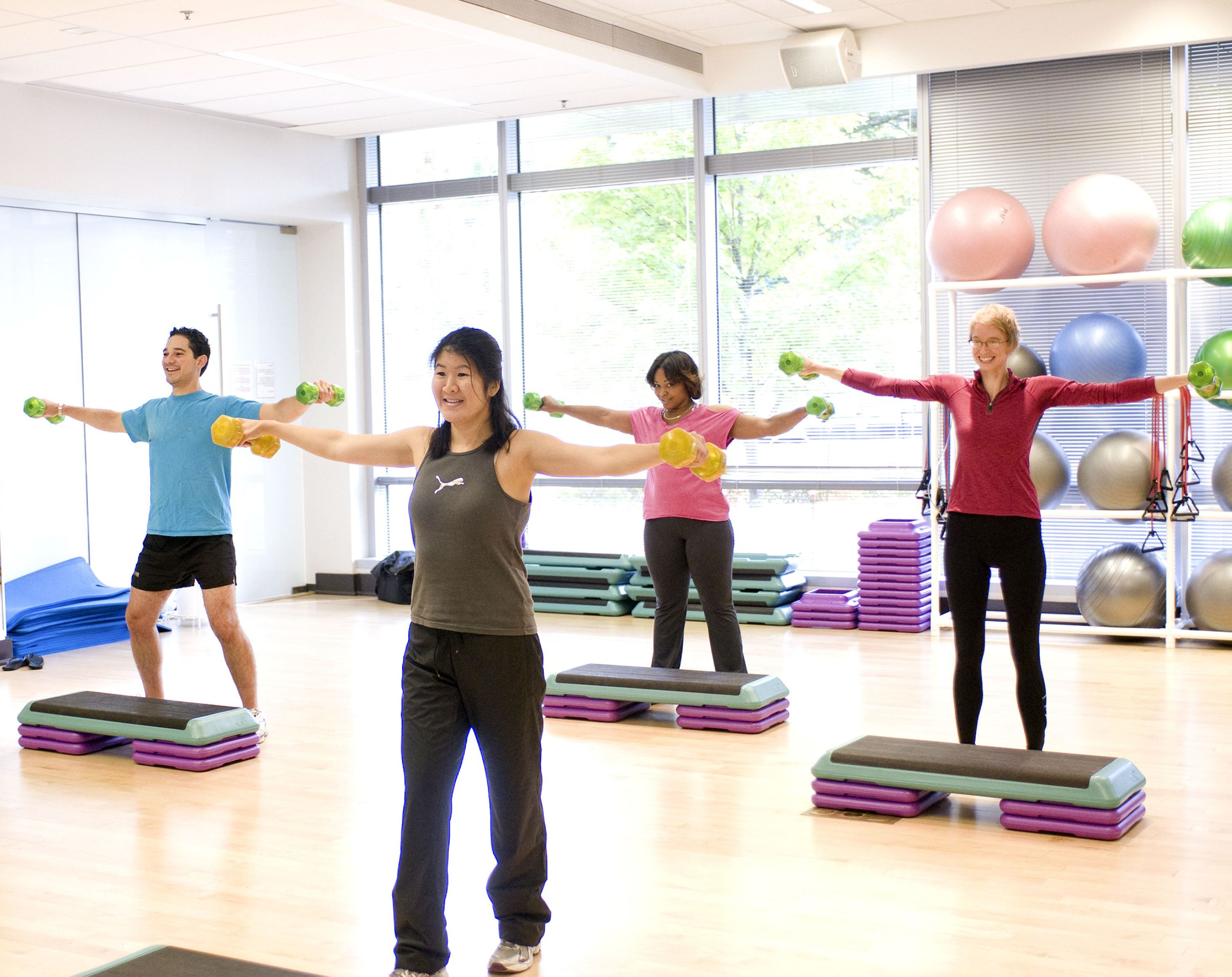
Aerobics using dumbbells

Step aerobics can also be involved in dancing games, such as Dance Dance Revolution, In the Groove and Wii Fit.

=== Moves and techniques ===
Often moves are referred to as Reebok step moves.

The "basic" step involves raising one foot onto the step, then the other so that they are both on the step, then stepping the first foot back, followed by the second. A "right basic" would involve stepping right foot up, then the left, then returning to the floor alternating right then left.

Some instructors switch immediately between different moves, for example between a right basic and a left basic without any intervening moves, effectively "tapping" the foot without shifting weight; tap-free or smooth stepping alternates the feet without "taps"

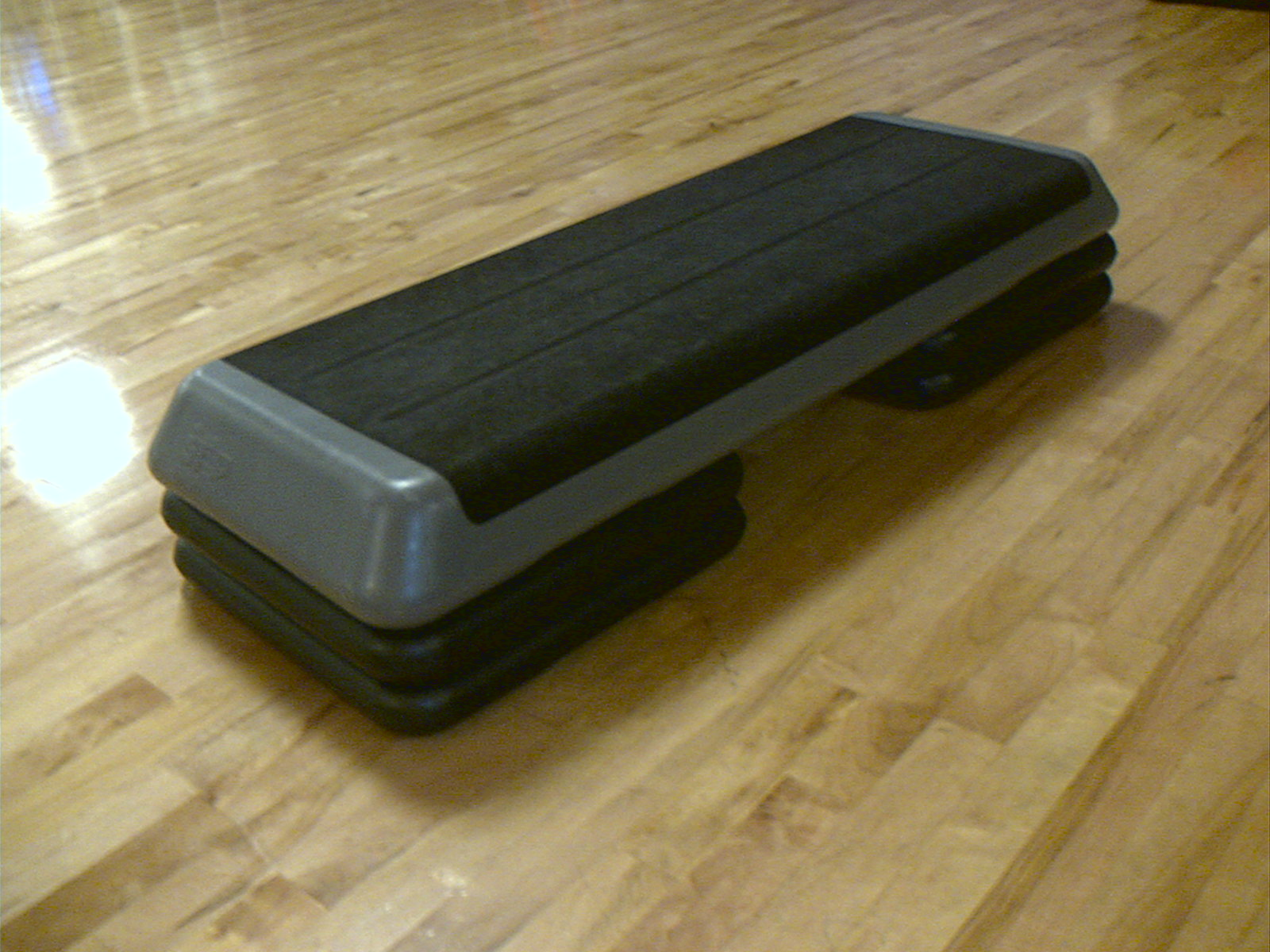
A step with two risers

Common moves include:

- Basic Step
- Corner knee (or corner kick)
- Repeater knee (aka Triple knee)
- T-Step
- Over-the-Top
- Lunges
- V-Step
- Straddle Down
- L-Step
- Split Step
- I-Step

=== Choreography ===
Many instructors will prepare a set of moves that will be executed together to form the choreography of the class. Usually, the choreography will be timed to 32 beats in a set, ideally switching legs so that the set can be repeated in a mirrored fashion. A set may consist of many different moves and the different moves may have different durations. For example, a basic step as described above takes 4 beats (for the 4 steps the person takes). Similarly, the "knee up" move also takes 4 beats. Another common move, the repeater knee, is an 8-beat move.

Classes vary in the level of choreography. Basic level classes will tend to have a series of relatively basic moves strung together into a sequence. More advanced classes incorporate dance elements such as turns, mambos, and stomps. These elements are put together into 2–3 routines in each class. One learns the routines during the class and then all are performed at the end of the class. Regardless of the complexity of the choreography, most instructors offer various options for different levels of intensity/dance ability while teaching the routines.

== Aerobic dances ==
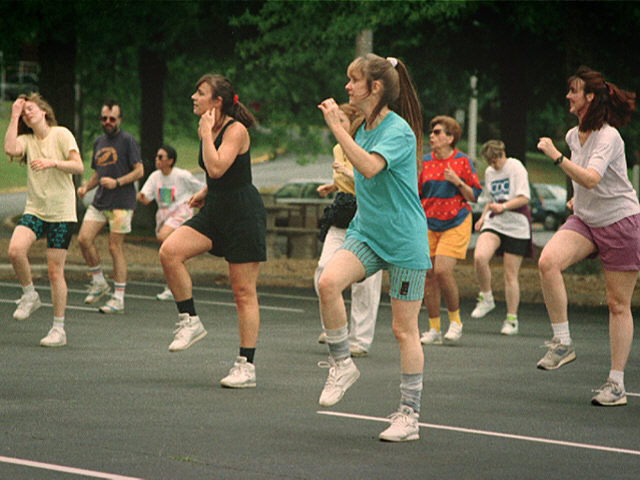
An aerobics class

Aerobic dances are musical fitness routines in which an instructor choreographs several short dance combinations and teaches them to a class. This is usually achieved by teaching the class one to two movements at a time and repeating the movements until the class is able to join the whole choreography together. Popular music is used throughout the class. This is sometimes followed by a strength section which uses body weight exercises to strengthen muscles and a stretch routine to cool down and improve flexibility. Classes are usually 30–60 minutes in length and may include the use of equipment such as a barbell, aerobic step, or small weights.

In freestyle aerobics, the instructor choreographs the routine and adjusts it to the needs and wants of their class. There is often no difference between base movements in freestyle and pre-choreographed programs.

It is practiced to improve cardio and strength.

== Aerobic gymnastics ==
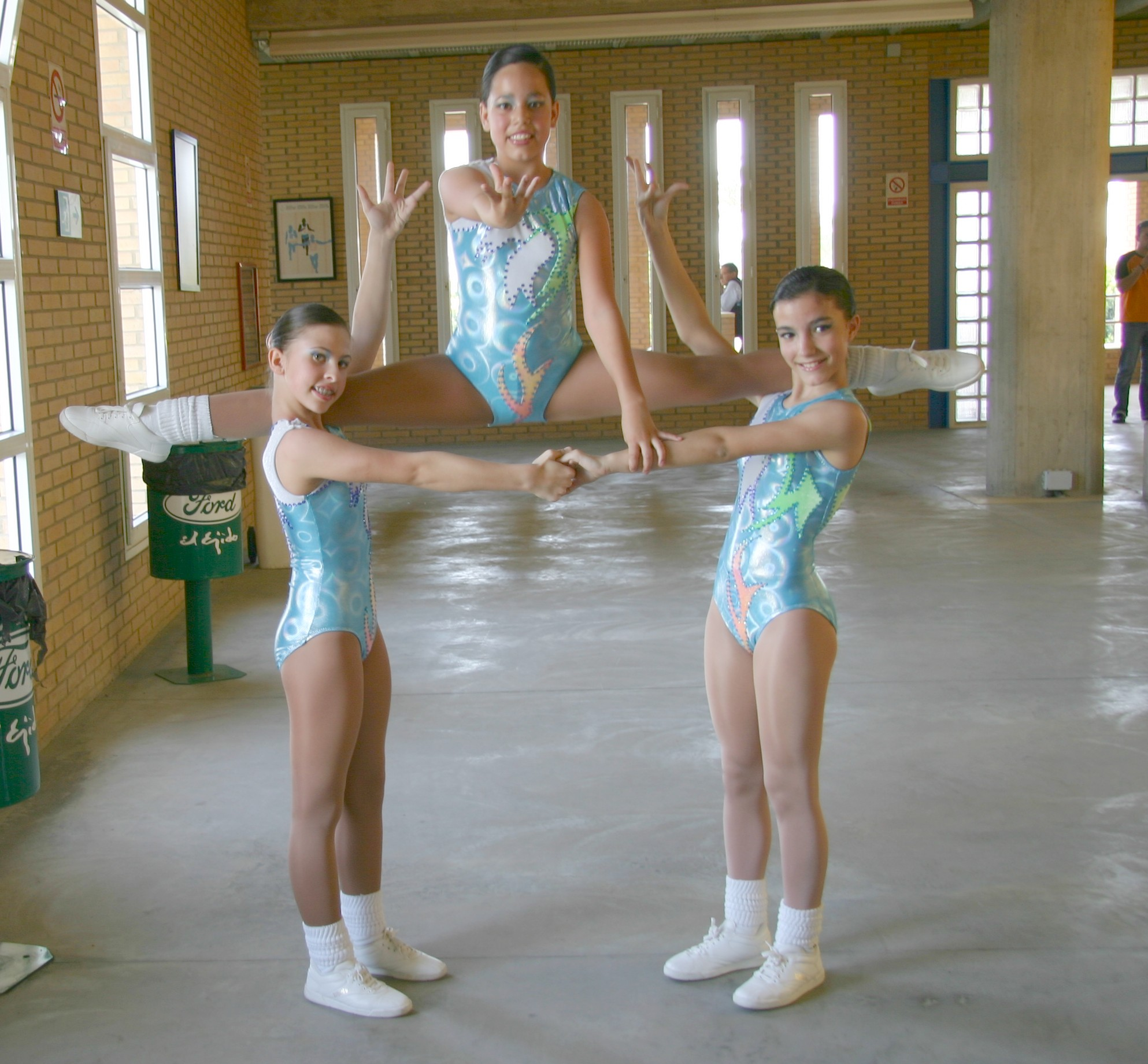
A sport aerobics team

Aerobic gymnastics, also known as sport aerobics and competitive aerobics, may combine complicated choreography, rhythmic and acrobatic gymnastics with elements of aerobics. Performance is divided into categories by age, sex and groups (individual, mixed pairs and trios) and are judged on the following elements: dynamic and static strength, jumps and leaps, kicks, balance and flexibility. Ten exercises are mandatory: four consecutive high leg kicks, patterns. A maximum of ten elements from following families are allowed: push-ups, supports and balances, kicks and splits, jumps and leaps. Elements of tumbling such as handsprings, handstands, back flips, and aerial somersaults are prohibited. Scoring is by judging of artistic quality, creativity, execution, and difficulty of routines. Sport aerobics has state, national, and international competitions, but is not an Olympic sport.

== See also ==
- 20th century women's fitness culture
- Jazzercise
- Water aerobics
- Zumba
