= The Debbie Drake Show =

American exercise television show

- Genre: Exercise, fitness
- Presented by: Debbie Drake
- Country of origin: United States
- Original language: English
- No. of seasons: 18

Original release
- Network: Syndication
- Release: September 4, 1960 – June 13, 1978

The Debbie Drake Show is an American exercise television show hosted by Debbie Drake that aired in syndication from 1960 to 1978.

== Background ==
Debbie Drake started her show on WHIO-TV in Dayton, Ohio, then transferred to WISH-TV in Indianapolis' before the show gained a following and was syndicated nationwide.

== Reception ==
The show was popular with men and women alike.
