= Debbie Drake =

American fitness and nutrition guru (1930–2024)

- Born: Velda Louise Bellah; March 28, 1930; Corpus Christi, Texas, U.S.
- Died: August 29, 2024 (aged 94)
- Occupations: Fitness expert; television host; inventor; entrepreneur; motivational speaker
- Television: The Debbie Drake Show

Debbie Drake (March 28, 1930 – August 29, 2024) was an American fitness and nutrition guru. Drake is most well-known for presenting The Debbie Drake Show from 1960 to 1978. She also published books and released exercise records.

== Career ==
Drake's career started after starting a local exercise show on regional television before being gaining popularity and being syndicated nationwide.

Drake appeared on the February 26, 1961 episode of What's My Line?.

In 2015, Drake was inducted into the National Fitness Hall of Fame.

Drake died on August 29, 2024, at age 94.
