= Gilad Janklowicz =

Israeli-born American fitness personality (1954–2026)

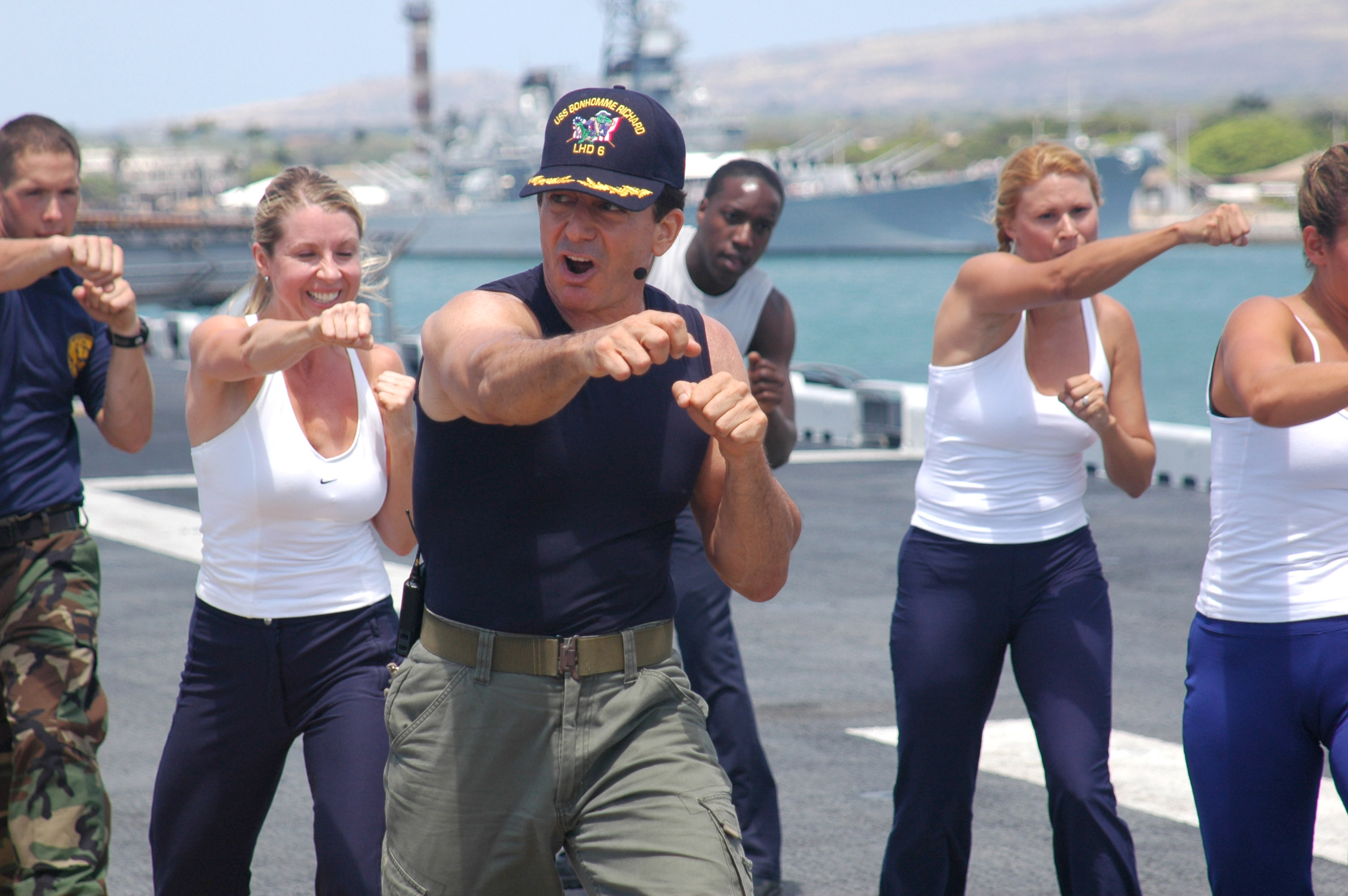
Janklowicz trains with the United States Navy

Gilad Janklowicz (Hebrew: גלעד ינקלוביץ'; /ɡɪˈlɑːd ˈdʒæŋkləwɪts/ ghil-AHD JANK-lə-wits; July 27, 1954 – June 9, 2026) was an Israeli-born American fitness personality best known for the longest-running fitness television series in the United States, Bodies in Motion, and for his series Total Body Sculpt with Gilad.

Raised in Israel, Janklowicz was an athlete devoted to fitness from his high school forward. He was an Olympic hopeful for the decathlon, and became a fitness instructor while in the Israeli military. Janklowicz later moved to Los Angeles to attend the UCLA film school. In Los Angeles, he built up a following as a fitness instructor for various gyms and exercise studios. Janklowicz is the creator of more than thirty exercise video titles. He was also featured in many print publications, including Arnold's Body Building For Men, in which it mentions Janklowicz trained for the 1984 Summer Olympics.

Bodies in Motion launched in 1983 as a half-hour aerobic workout show, and was the first fitness-related show on ESPN, where it aired from 1985 to 1996. Most recently, it aired on Discovery Fit and Health. Gilad also hosted a game show called Gilad's Minds in Motion.

In March 2007, Janklowicz was inducted into the National Fitness Hall of Fame.

Janklowicz died on June 9, 2026, at the age of 71.
