= Music and aerobic exercise performance =

Use of music in fitness

Fitness instructors rely heavily on the use of music during their class as a way of motivating their clients. In addition to making physical activity and exercise more enjoyable, athletes have used music as an ergogenic aid. Most of the studies that have explored the effects of music on performance was aerobic performance. Aerobic performance is assessed by measuring specific parameters of, such as maximal oxygen consumption (VO_{2} max), heart rate (HR), rate of perceived exertion (RPE), and blood lactate (mmol/ L), power output (W). There is conflicting data regarding the effects of music on aerobic performance. On one hand, studies have suggested that music does increase aerobic exercise performance by influencing certain parameters, such as rate of perceived exertion and time to exhaustion. However, there are studies that rebuke this notion, stating that music had no effect on aerobic performance. The reason for this disparity among data is the construction of the tests themselves. There are several factors that need to be taken into account when exploring the effects of music on exercise. Those include: exercise intensity, the subject experience in performing exercise, and type of music.

== Intensity of exercise ==
Research predominantly measure RPE and HR when relating music and exercise intensity. There appears to be a threshold where the use of music as an aid has no ergogenic effects. Studies have found that there are no benefits to music when exercising at or above 60% of VO2max. However, at or below 50% of VO2max of submaximal exercise, music has an ergogenic effect by decreasing RPE values at any given point of the exercise. Increased exercise intensity has been shown to hinder the “distraction effect” caused by listening to music while exercising.

This finding suggests that music can be beneficial for long durations of light to moderate intensity exercise and improve aerobic performance by “distracting” the individual exercising. One reason for this is in reference to the “parallel processing model” of psychology, stating that the body has a limited amount of sensory stimuli it can acquire at any given point. Based on this model, it is said that music and perceived fatigue, both being stimuli, appear to be inversely related. Music has been shown to have neither increase or decrease heart rate of subjects performing submaximal exercise. Differentiating systems in control of heart rate with music can cause this, because of the sympathetic vs. autonomic pathways involved in the cardiac responses during exercise. It is said that the intensity of exercise has the greatest effect masking the potential benefits of music. However, Umemura (1998) did suggest that slow/toned-down music can control sympathetic nervous activation whilst upbeat music can increase activation. At higher intensity exercise (greater than or equal to 60% VO2max), perceived fatigue has a more predominant effect than music on sensory organs and therefore music won't produce the benefits as it would during low to moderate intensity exercise.

== Subject choice ==
Hagen et al. (2013) examined the relationship of music and exercise performance on 18 well-trained cyclists/triathletes (9 males, 9 females) who were training at least 7 hours a week. The subjects completed 10 km cycle time trials. During the time trial the subjects listened to self selected music that they believed could improve their performance. There was no statistical difference on performance, mean power output, HRmax, peak blood lactate, or peak RPE between the music and non-music time trials. The subjects reported that even though the music trials were more enjoyable, it distracted them from focusing on power output, breathing rate, and distance covered. Subjects also reported that the music trial felt easier compared to the no music trials even though there was no significant difference in exercise performance.

Bigliassi, Dantas, Carneiro, Smirmaul, & Altimari (2012) studied the effect of music during the warm-up and performance of a 5 km time trial of 10 amateur/professional cyclists. The subjects self-selected music they believed could improve their time trial performance. The research team had the same results as the previously described study; there was no significant difference in time to completion, power output, heart rate and RPE between the control and music groups.

== Music preference ==
Synchronous music is described as the synchronization between tempo and human movement in terms responding to the rhythmical qualities of music. Motivational music is described as music with strong rhythms and are fast tempo (>120 bpm). Type of music has the ability to change arousal levels and may be used as a stimulant or sedative. Music may narrow bodies awareness of fatigue. Synchronous and Asynchronous music has been shown to have significant ergogenic effects on non-professional athletes.

In a study by Karageorghis et al. (2009) the effects of motivational synchronous music, oudeterous synchronous music and a no-music control condition was examined for four dependent measures which included time to exhaustion, ratings of perceived exertion (RPE), in-task affect, and exercise-induced feelings. 100 sports science undergraduates participated in the study and went through a thorough music selection procedure where they were able to choose the type of music they wanted and testers were able to create a standardized motivational music track list which would be able to create the desired affects. The subjects then walked briskly on a treadmill at an appropriate velocity that would ensure an exercise intensity of 75% maximal heart rate reserve. Results showed both music conditions had a significant effect on time to exhaustion and in-task affect. However, there were no significant differences in exercise induced feelings or RPE.
