= National Fitness Hall of Fame =

American fitness industry hall of fame

- Formation: December 2, 2004
- Founder: John Figarelli
- Region served: United States
- Official language: English
- President: John Figarelli
- Website: www.nationalfitnessmuseum.com

National Fitness Hall of Fame is an American hall of fame for notable fitness professionals. It includes notable figures involved in fitness instruction, training, education, fitness management and product development. The mission is to recognize and support fitness professionals for their dedication to helping others "Get Fit and Stay Healthy" and provide programs and services that helps all individuals achieve a better level of health and fitness.

== History ==
John Figarelli founded the National Fitness Hall of Fame on December 2, 2004, to honor individuals and organizations who had made a lifetime contribution to health and fitness. Inductees are classed as pioneers, educators, instructors, sports medicine, celebrity spokespeople, and organizations. One of the criteria for membership is at least twenty-five years of service as a full-time Health and Fitness industry professional. Figarelli formed the National Fitness Organization, a corporation, in December 2004, with his wife, mother and father. They rented a small location in Sycamore, Illinois, to hold Figarelli's collection of fitness memorabilia, which would form the nucleus of the museum.

The first class of 2005 had twelve members, including Arnold Schwarzenegger, Jack LaLanne and Charles Atlas. Other inductees included Joe Weider, Vic Tanny, Arthur Jones, Paul Bragg and Kenneth H. Cooper. The National Fitness Hall of Fame is the only institution in the nation that recognizes those individuals who pioneered the fitness industry, preservers fitness history and promotes the future of fitness in America.

The fourth class of ten members was inducted in 2008 with a dinner, silent auction and ceremony, and was attended by many of the inductees. The ceremony was held at the Oak Meadows Golf Club in Addison, Illinois, and was hosted by Gilad Janklowicz of the television show Bodies in Motion. There were about 250 attendees. Inductees included Cory Everson, Tamilee Webb, Charles Kuntzleman, Michael Thurmond and others.

In November 2014 Bill Crawford (2012 NFHOF Inductee) a fitness trainer and owner of a gym in Scottsdale, Arizona, was appointed Chairman of the National Fitness Hall of Fame and served a 3-year term ending in 2017.

Inclusive among the National Fitness Hall of Fame inductees are four elected Fellows in the National Academy of Kinesiology: Steven N. Blair, P.E.D., Fellow #302, who also served as Academy President during 1994–1995; Janice S. Todd, Ph.D., Fellow #511; Thomas K. Cureton, Ph.D., Fellow #119, who received the academy's Highest Honor, the Hetherington Award, in 1976; and Dudley Allen Sargent, M.D., Honorary Fellow in Memoriam.

== Inductees ==
- Charles Atlas
- Paul Bernstein
- Joe Bonomo
- Dr. Paul C. Bragg, ND
- Kenneth H. Cooper
- Nancy Claussen
- Bill Crawford
- Debbie Drake
- Clyde Emrich
- Jane Fonda
- Cathe Friedrich
- Bob Gajda
- Marilu Henner
- Bob Hoffman
- Gilad Janklowicz
- Kathy Kaehler
- Professor Len Kravitz
- Fredrick Hatfield
- Jack LaLanne
- Joe Lupo
- David Lyons
- Tony Little
- Anibal Lopez
- Bernarr Macfadden
- Lenda Murray
- Bill Pearl
- Joseph Pilates
- Bonnie Prudden
- Forbes Riley
- Leslie Sansone
- Professor Thomas Sattler
- Arnold Schwarzenegger
- Richard Simmons
- Kathy Smith
- Vic Tanny
- Michael Thurmond
- Dennis Tinerino
- Terry Todd
- Tamilee Webb
- David P. Webster
- Ben Weider
- Betty Weider
- Joe Weider
- Dr. Robert Weil, DPM

(Complete list of NFHOF Inductees can be found at the website: www.NationalFitnessHallofFame.com)
