= 20th century women's fitness culture =

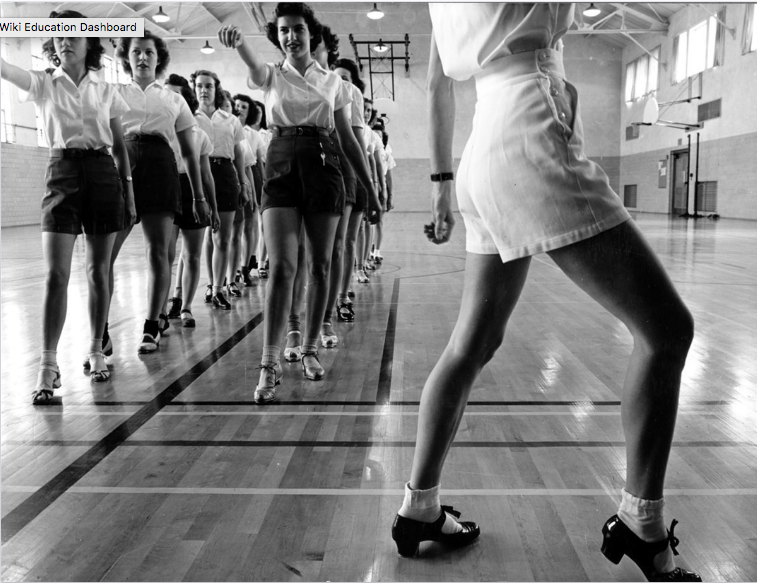
1940s women's physical education class

The 20th century saw multiple trends and changes in women's fitness culture.

Over time, as with clothes, body shapes change fashion. As a result of this, the rise of the internet and marketing on social media. This has led to a large change in fitness culture.

This article mostly focuses on women in the United States of America.

== 1900 to 1920 ==
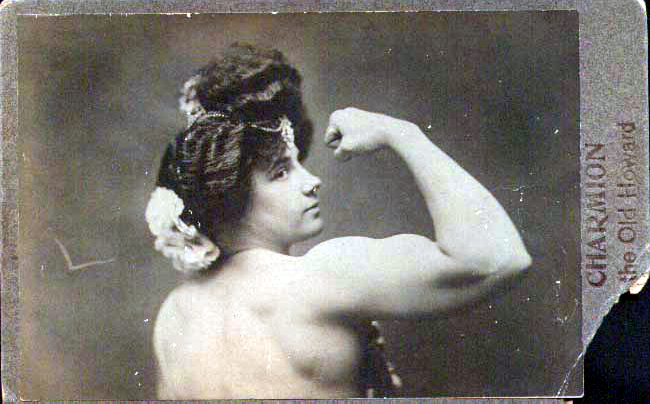
Laverie Vallée as Charmion

During the 20th century, women participated in many forms of recreational fitness. Specific activities depended largely on the culture and social class, but some activities included horse back riding, dancing, tennis, and early versions of badminton.

Social, commercial and scientific developments between 1900 and 1920 led to the increase of physical activities available to American women. Opportunities for women flourished as organized sports began to grow in popularity and physical education programs for girls were introduced in schools. One sport that was introduced in America at the turn of the century was basketball which quickly swept over schools and playgrounds across the nation. While initially men played the sport, it wasn't long before women too could be found playing basketball at parks, YWCA's, playgrounds, and in schools from kindergarten's through universities. However, women's basketball rules were different than men's due to fear that women may over exert themselves, or dislodge their uterus, if play became too intense.

Another major achievement in the growing women's fitness movement, was when women first competed in the Olympics. American physical educators, who were viewed as the experts on the topic at the time, strongly objected to women participating in the olympics. They claimed that it caused unnecessary physical strain and may create divisions among women. Despite this, after seeing what other women athletes were capable of doing, many women began to rethink their athletic limitations and capabilities.

One social and commercial development at the turn of the 20th century was the emergence of a group of female trapeze artists known as "strong women". They were at first criticized for opposing societal gender norms, but with the emergence of the cinema they soon became very popular icons for female health. One famous trapeze artist of this time was Laverie Vallée, better known as Charmion. Her trapeze act was filmed and produced by Thomas Edison in 1901, and is known as the Trapeze Disrobing Act. The very popular 3 minute video shows Vallée swinging through the air, undressing herself while revealing a very muscular upper body. As more strong women like Vallée performed, their images were publicized through posters and postcards throughout the United States. These images challenged the aesthetic ideal of the female body.

Scientific developments of the time were spearheaded by male physical educators whose work was focused on how to create the most efficient human body, both male and female. Their focus was on the bodies weight and shape. Their research was focused on determining what the ideal, most efficient body would be like.

=== Dudley Allen Sargent ===
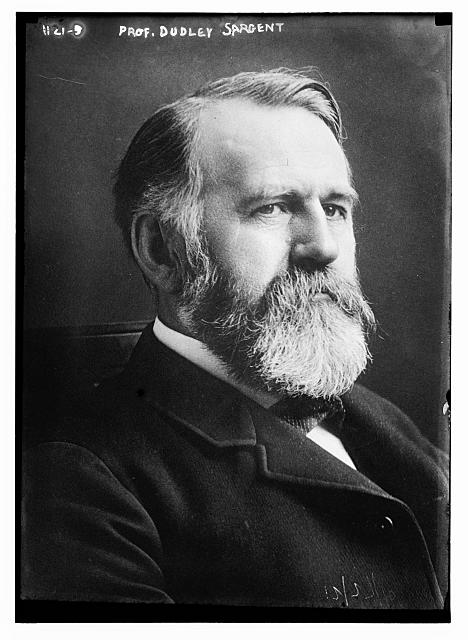
Dudley Sargent

One of the leading physical educators at the time was Dudley Allen Sargent, his research along with many others came to the conclusion that the ideal body was a slim one. Any unnecessary fat was inefficient. This idea spread quickly, and at the turn of the 20th century the ideal female figure was between 5'3" and 5'7", and weighed between 125 and 140 lbs. Sargent advocated that the ideal female figure for young and developing girls is a boyish one. This kind of figure allowed girls to more easily participate in physical activities. His critics often worried that the new female figure was becoming too masculine. Sargent believed that more physical activity would actually lead to a more graceful female figure. He also believed that the corset exaggerated feminine features and took away from "true womanliness". Sargent felt that true beauty lay in symmetry and the "natural development" of the female figure.

A greater interest in knowing one's weight and where one ranked according to the norm set by the physical educators of the time emerged as a result. Anxiety over fat led to a cultural shift to control ones weight to conform with the norm.

== 1920 to 1940 ==
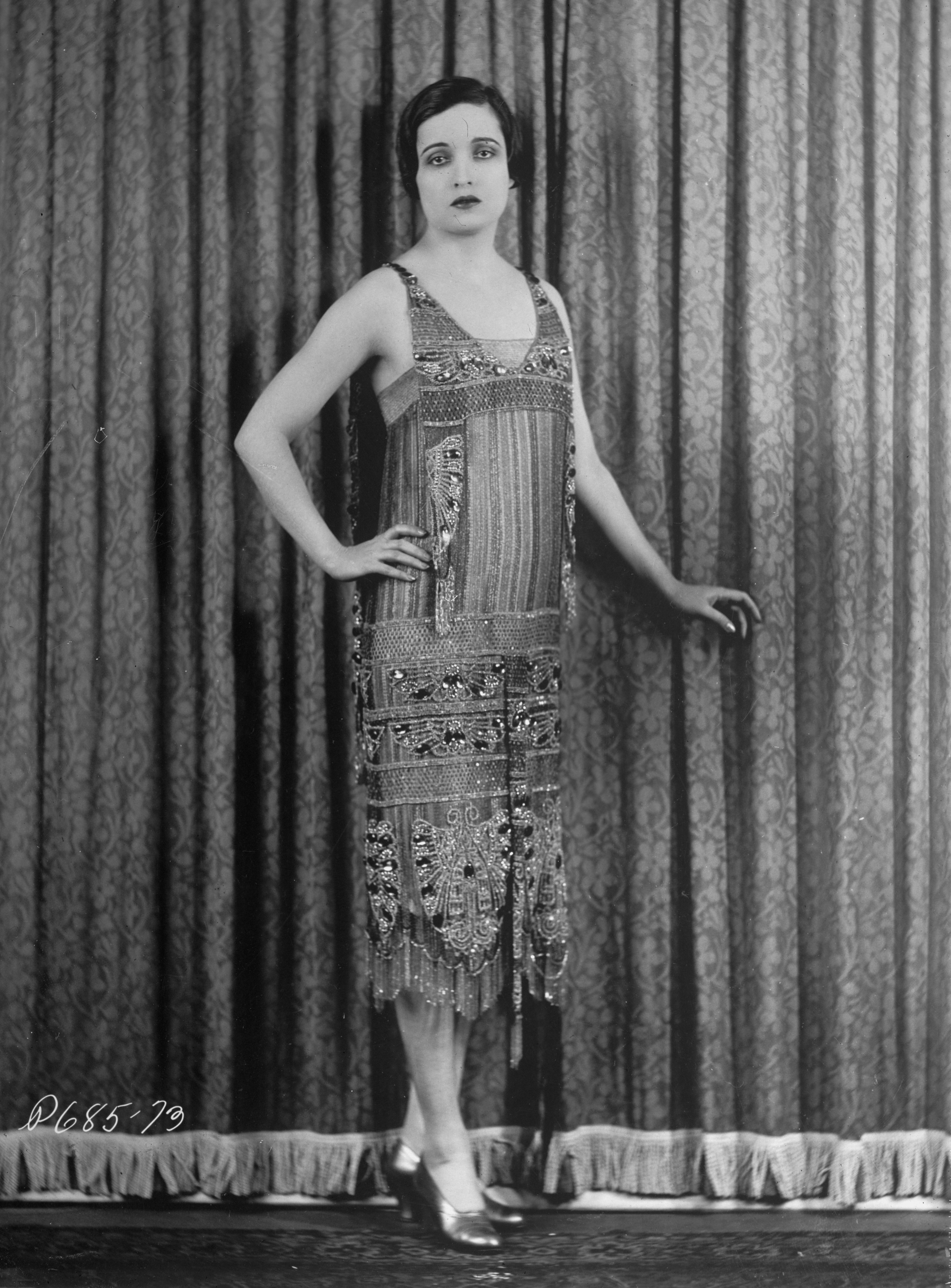
The "New Woman" Flapper Style

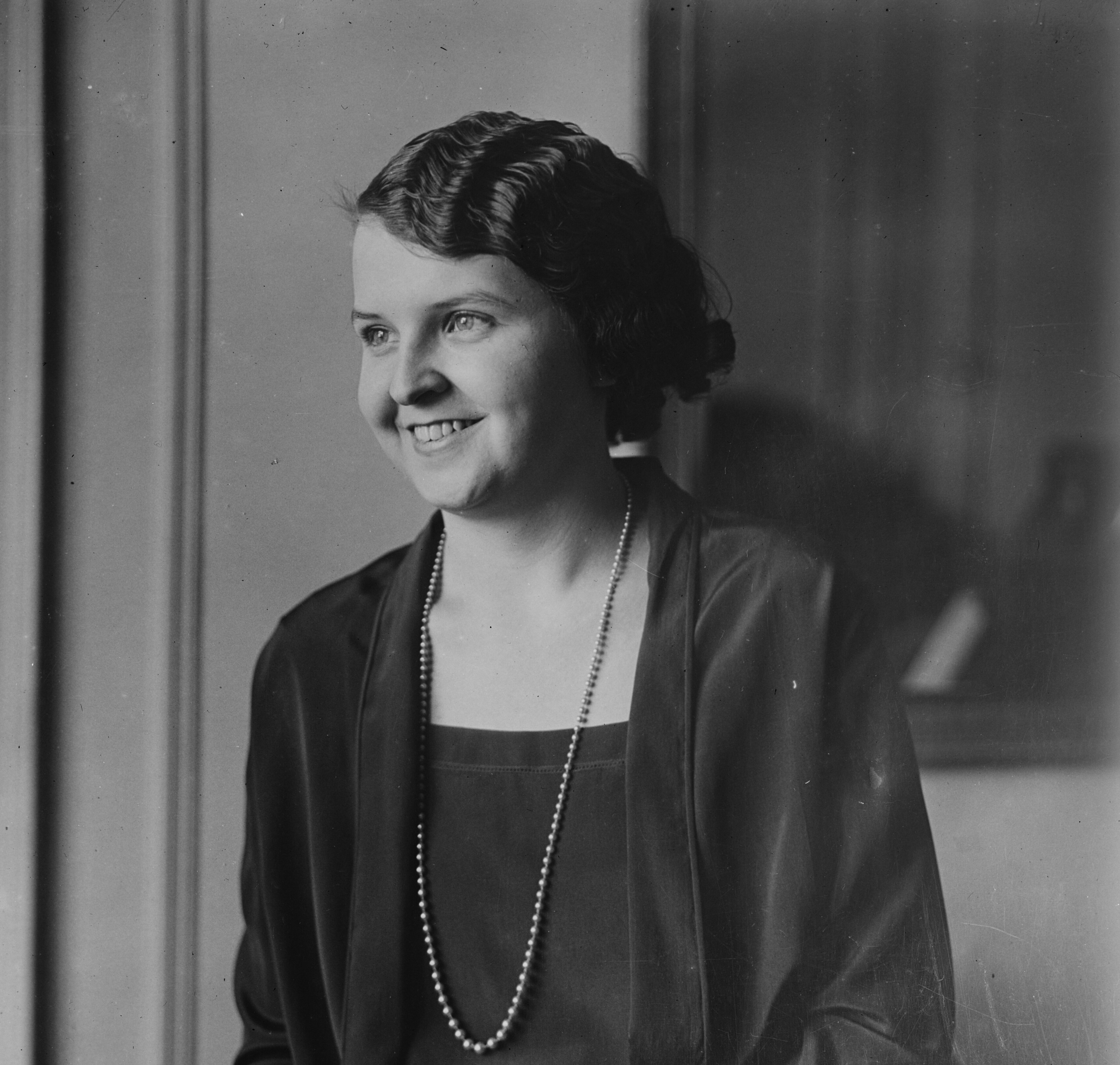
Marion Talley in 1927

The 1920s was a progressive era for women's rights, with this came women's opposition to previous ideals of the "feminine body". The "New Woman's" (as they were frequently called) body was slender and boyish, contrasting the feminine curves of the 19th century woman. Clothing companies, food companies, and the media all promoted this new ideal of slimness and it spread quickly throughout society. Weight became a hot topic for public scrutiny as did private organizations effort to intervene and help people achieve the ideal body shape.

One example is an advertisement in the November 1936 edition of Life Magazine for the Ry-Krisp, a whole rye wafer. Displayed in the advertisement is a picture of a box of Ry-Krisps next to a bowl of fruit. The other pictures display two photos of Marion Talley, a famous singer, taken 10 years apart. The first picture is from 1926, and shows Talley as a pudgy 19 year old. The next picture is a full body shot of Talley in 1936, now weighing 107 pounds and looking younger than she did in 1926. The advertisement describes how Marion lost the weight exercising and eating Ry-Krisps as a bread substitute. The advertisement goes on to explain that Ry-Krisps are non-fattening food that can be used at any meal.

Eating disorders, particularly anorexia, spiked as women strived for slim bodies. Women also believed it was possible to become "too skinny" which was also not desirable. The slim figure was not only obtained through extreme eating habits, but basic at-home exercises were encouraged for women to maintain and develop trim figures. One popularly advertised method for losing weight was dancing to aerobic "reducing" records. Before and after pictures were included to show women the results they should expect.

At this time, African American and White cultures were largely separated, but promotion of exercise, and the ideal of a slim body, were promoted in both cultures. In black culture, (similarly to white) women with healthy, fit bodies were associated with being patriotic, comely, trustworthy, and affluent. Exercise was promoted to lose weight and achieve these ideals.

== 1940 to 1960 ==
Following WWII, some women returned to a life of domesticity, while others desired to continue working. Women became increasingly involved in sports and it wasn't long after the war that the first women's athletic revolution, which allowed more rights for women athletes and coaches, was created. For women not interested in joining sports teams, magazines continued to offer several articles full of advice for women on how to stay fit, including simple exercises, or popular fitness programs to join in on. Some articles capitalized on women's new-found independence, offering workout programs that would make them strong enough to help do "men's work" or hard labor in times of emergency, others offered after-hour fitness programs for working women, and some targeted the at-home mom and how she could fit fitness into her everyday routine without spending a penny. During the late 40s special "exercise suits" that resembled swimwear of the time, even began to be offered for the everyday woman's fitness routines.

Various means of aiding women in becoming slim were advertised in magazines.

On January 8, 1940, Life Magazine wrote about a new phonographic record produced by RCA Records. The record contained 19 different exercises aimed at helping women fight "a battle against growing curves." The exercises featured in the record were created by Wanda Bowman-Wilson, a female fitness trainer in New York. The exercises were specifically aimed at slimming the hips through various movements such as high kicks, lunges, and squats and the program promised to help remove inches of excess fat from the hip area.

The November 4th, 1940 edition of Life Magazine included a small article about the MacLevy "Slenderizing Salons". The article featured pictures of model, Pat Ogden on various reducing machines. The article displays pictures of Ogden and other women using the machines on their calves, thighs, ankles, stomach, back and hips to rub away the excess fat on their bodies.

Good Housekeeping also included articles advising women on how to "change their shape". Articles covered exercises aiming to help women improve posture, slim their hips and trim their ankles while not thinning their faces, as well as expand their chest while shrinking their waist and arms. Diet was included in exercise suggestions and most exercises were merely simple stretches.

The Ladies' Home Journal published an article in February 1941 about health and beauty from the perspective of Dr. T. A. Pierson and his son Dr. J. R. Pierson. In the article the two doctors offer advice to women on how to stay slim and encourage women to follow a simple "slimming diet" rather than fad diets. They suggest that it is better for women to be under weight than overweight. They also explain how one of the best exercises for a woman are her household duties, and that besides those she doesn't need more exercise.

== 1960 to 1980 ==
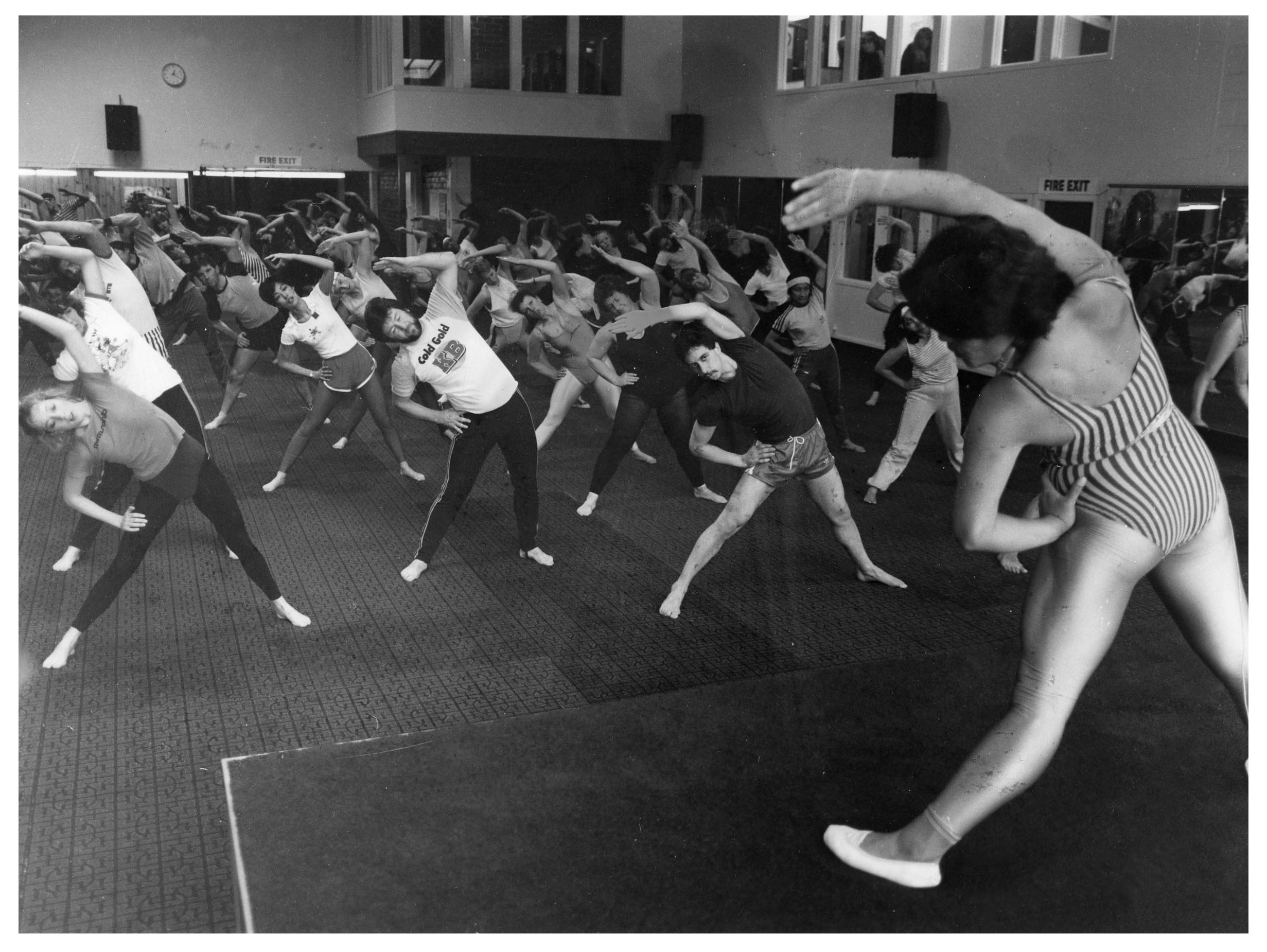
Jazzercise class in 1983

Exercise during the late 1960s aimed towards both maintaining a trim figure as well as increasing flexibility and overall well-being. Exercises were intended to tone legs, and strengthen the core and arms, while improving flexibility and grace. Some exercises included basic squats with knees together, ballet positions such as holding an arabesque, variations of sit-ups, and repetitions of leg raises.

Fad diet pills became more accessible in the 1960s. In 1968, Life magazine's cover story was on a diet pill scandal. The article highlights a growing group of "fat doctors" who treat "fat" women. These "fat doctors" prescribe a variety of pills aimed to help women lose weight. It became a scandal when an increasing number of women were dying due to an incorrect use of the pills. Life magazine reporter Susan McBee went undercover for the article to learn more about the "fat doctors" and the practice of prescribing diet pills. Although McBee was far from overweight, she was 5'5" and weighed 125 pounds, each "fat doctor" she saw prescribed her diet pills to help her lose weight.

With the passage of Title IX and a growing feminist movement, women began to hold a more prominent role in exercise, specifically aerobics. Jacki Sorensen and Judi Missett were two women that came to the forefront of aerobic exercise in the 1970s and 80s. Both had been dancers and created exercise programs that combined aerobic exercise with dance. Jacki Sorensen founded Aerobic Dancing Inc. which began as a television program in 1969, and later became a book with audio and videocassette tapes. By 1981, there were four thousand and seventy Aerobics Instructors in forty-five states. Judi Missett started Jazzercise in 1969. She used VCR machines to sell her exercise dance routines to paid instructors across the country. She also wrote a very popular book called Jazzercise: A Fun Way to Fitness, in 1978. Throughout the 70's and 80's, more aerobic fitness stars emerged such as Martha Rounds, Debbie Rosas, Nancy Strong, and Gilda Marx. They spread aerobic exercises like dance aerobics to women across the United States.

In the early 1970s, commercialized fitness programs continued to be popular. One boasted of results in only three days, through doing just five minutes of ab exercises a day. The before pictures portray a sad, pudgy woman, while the picture of 'after 14 days' pictures her with a very thin waist, toned arms, large bust, and a beaming smile.

== 1980 to 2000 ==
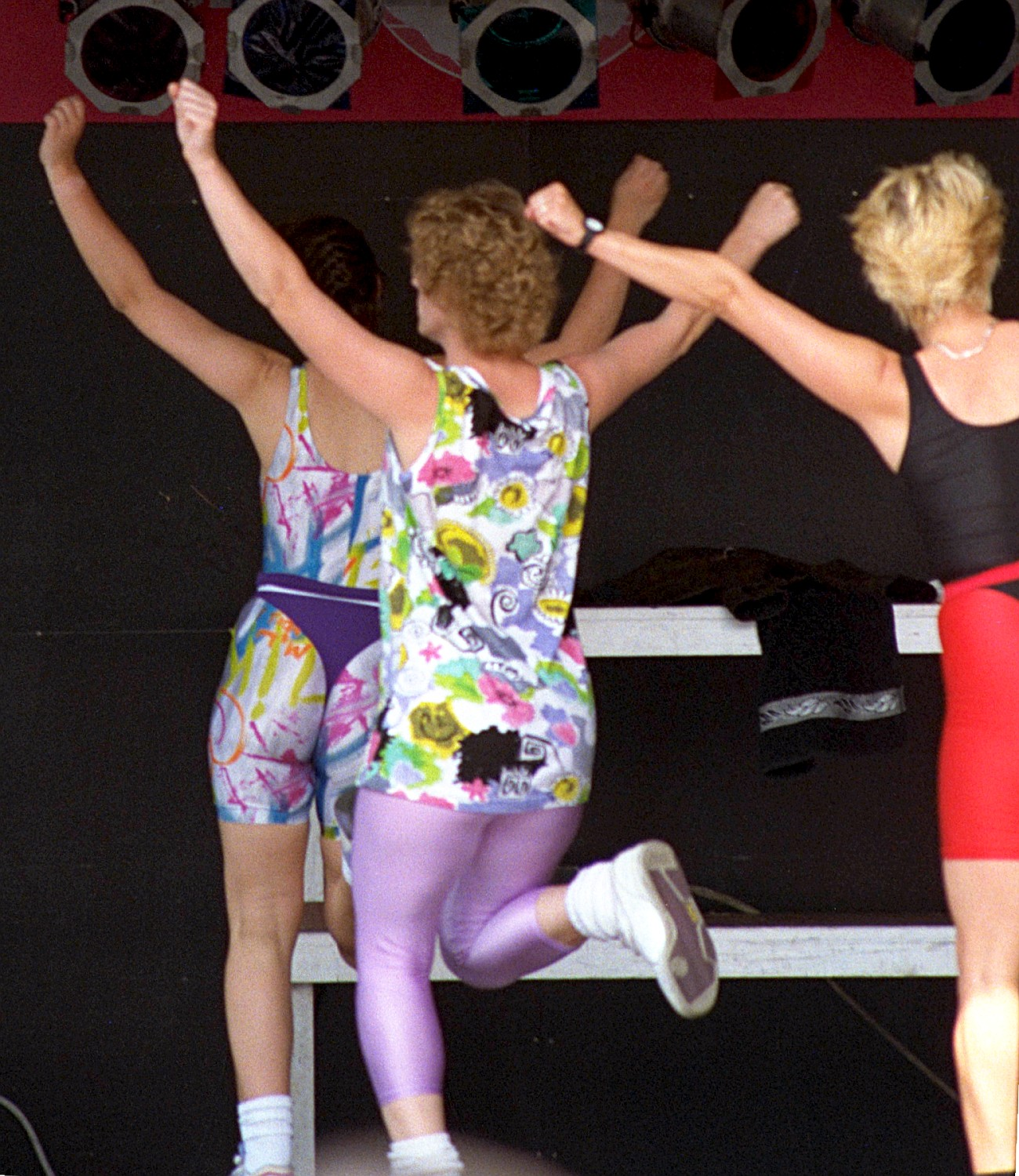
Women participating in aerobic exercises

During the 1980s, videocassettes were sold to let women exercise at home. One popular videotape exercise instructor was Jane Fonda. Most of her programs featured aerobics. Public television featured Body Electric, which was aerobics and muscle training. These broadcast instructions usually features instructions such as "don't forget to breathe" or "this part is great for the gluteus maximus". The exercises followed along with a hit popular songs. Soon there was a videocassette for every type of exercise. Richard Simmons was popular because of having lost a large amount of weight. His video shows were very motivational for viewers of all types.

== 2000 to 2020 ==
Following the media transition from videocassettes to CDs, DVD, and internet, interactive fitness programs emerge. For example, Katie Dunlop, a nutritionist and fitness instructor, in 2014, founded the Love Sweat Fitness platform. The brand experienced a surge in sales of direct-to-consumer workout services in response to the coronavirus pandemic as more people seek at-home workout alternatives. Furthermore, in 2012 the group CHAARG (changing health attitudes to recreate girls) was founded in response to the large percentage of women who felt uncomfortable in a fitness setting. Their goal as an organization is to encourage women to feel more comfortable in a gym by doing group workouts together.

== See also ==
- Women's health
