= Kathy Smith (fitness personality) =

American exercise instructor

- Born: December 11, 1951 (age 73); Arizona, U.S.
- Occupation: Personal trainer

Kathy Smith (born December 11, 1951) is an American personal trainer who became well known for her workout videos during the late 1980s and 1990s. She has sold over 16 million workout videos since 1980. Her exercise and nutrition program Project:You! Type 2 was created in association with the American Diabetes Association as a complete lifestyle system to help manage Type 2 diabetes.

== Early life ==
Smith was born in Arizona. She is the daughter of an Air Force pilot, and grew up in Brazil, Alabama, Hawaii, Texas and Illinois. When Smith was 17, her father died of a heart attack, and a year and a half later her mother died in a plane crash. Following the loss of her parents, Smith began exercising to combat depression. Smith enrolled at the University of Hawaii, and graduated with a degree in business administration.

Smith's fitness videos made her a multi-millionaire by her mid-thirties. She is an inductee to the Video Hall of Fame. In 1993, Kathy Smith moved her videos from Media Home Entertainment to A*Vision Entertainment's startup label BodyVision.

== Personal life ==
Smith has two daughters, Perrie and Kate. Kate is a professional runner who made the final in the 800-metre event at the 2016 Summer Olympics in Rio.

== Videography ==
- Personal Trainer: Total Body Workout (DVD, 1999, ISBN 0-7389-2149-1)
