= Jacki Sorensen =

Originator of aerobic dancing

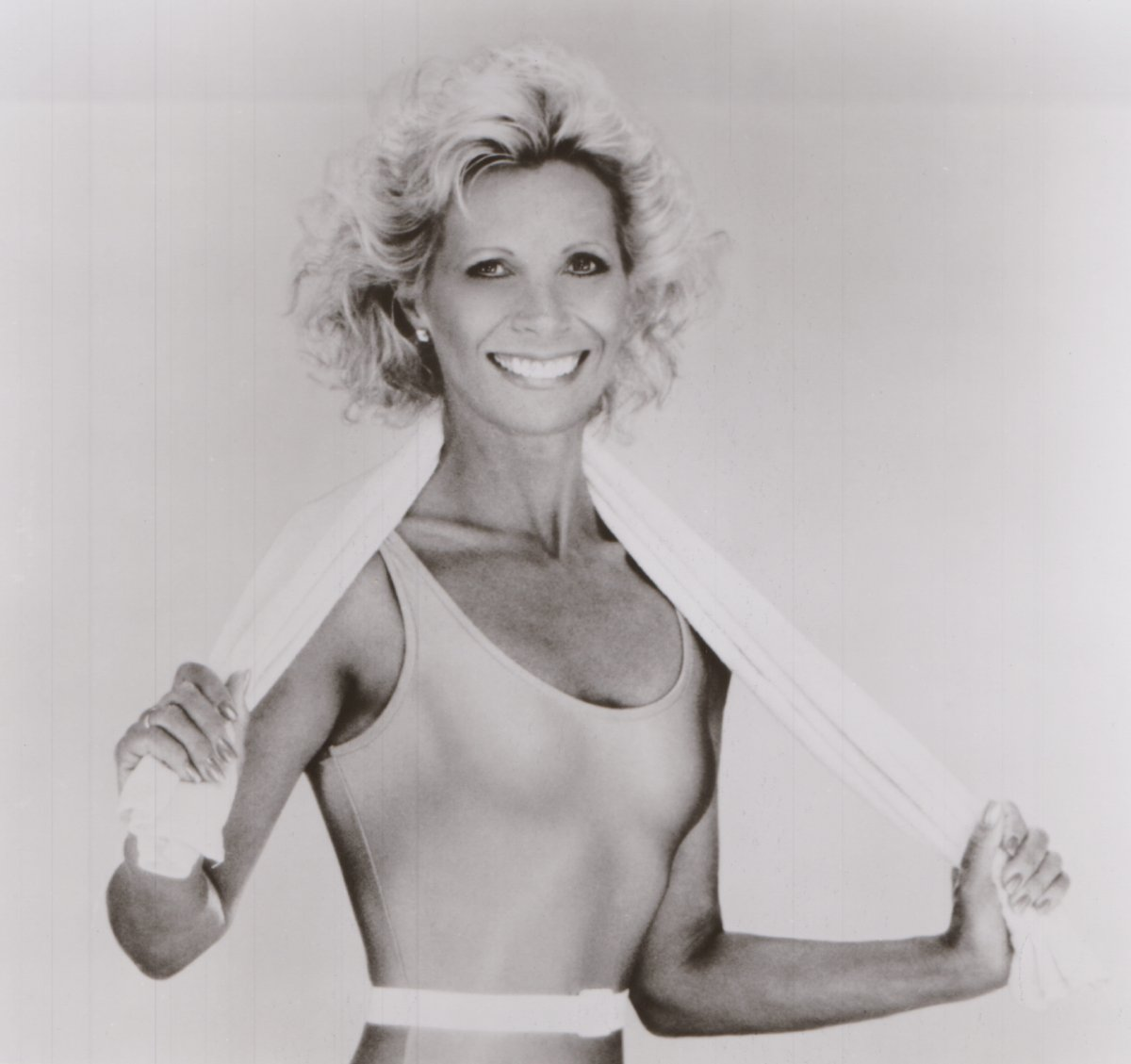
- Born: Jacqueline Faye Mills; December 10, 1942 (age 83); Oakland, California, U.S.
- Education: University of California, Berkeley, (B.S.S.); Seton Hall University, (M.S.)
- Occupations: Exercise instructor, dancer, businessperson
- Known for: Aerobics
- Height: 5 ft 4 in (1.63 m)
- Website: jackis.com

Jacki Sorensen (born Jacqueline Faye Mills; December 10, 1942) is the American originator of aerobic dancing, popularly known as aerobics. Inspired by Dr. Kenneth H. Cooper's 1968 book on aerobic exercise, she created for women an aerobic dance routine to music in 1969 in Puerto Rico, teaching U.S. Air Force wives. She expanded this concept into a teaching method and studio franchise, Aerobic Dancing Inc., that rose to 1,500 locations and 4,000 instructors teaching 170,000 students in 1981 at its peak.

The Lotto shoe company came out with the "Jacki" signature aerobics shoe in 1982. Eight years later, after experiencing declining profits because of competition, Sorensen changed her business name to Jacki's, Inc., and soon integrated the new step aerobics style. Jacki's continues today with instructors and studios in the U.S., Australia and Japan.

Called the "mother of aerobic dancing", Sorensen served on the President's Council on Physical Fitness and Sports for six years in the 1970s, and was honored with a Lifetime Achievement Award by that body in 2012. In 2020, she was inducted into the National Fitness Hall of Fame.

== Early life ==
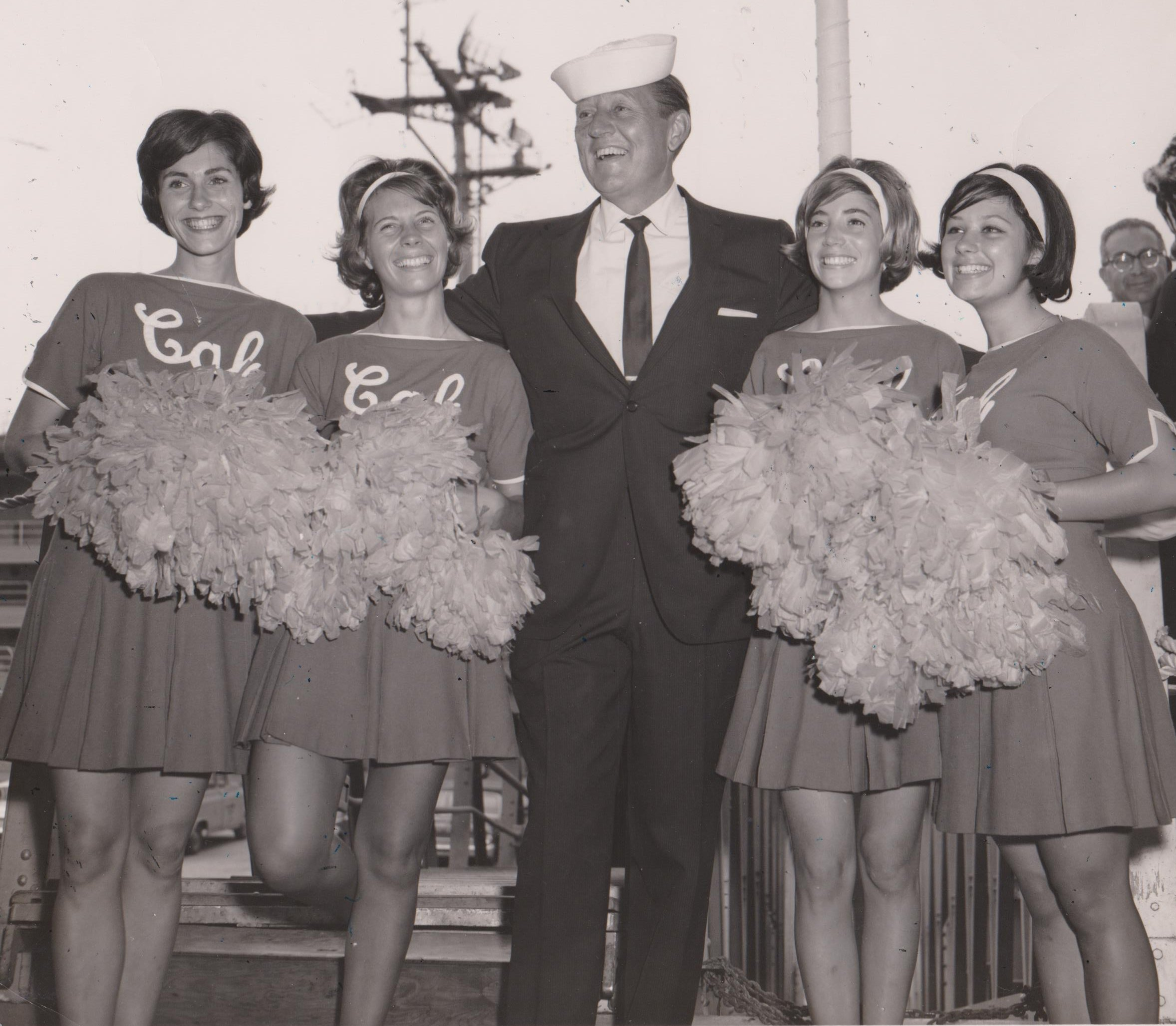
Art Linkletter and the Cal Berkeley pom-pom squad in 1963. Sorensen is second from left.

Sorensen was born Jacqueline Faye Mills in Oakland, California, the daughter of Roy C. Mills and Juanita F. Bullon. She was raised in nearby San Leandro and Castro Valley. Sorensen took dancing classes as a child and by age 12 she was teaching. To master one routine combining tap dance with skipping rope, she skipped rope frequently until she could breathe comfortably at the same time. She danced professionally while still in her teens. She danced the hula at 16, appeared in an Oakland beauty contest at 17, and danced in a Gay '90s chorus line troupe at 18. She found that professional dancers needed to be taller than her height of 5 feet 4 inches (1.63 m), so she enrolled in university. In June 1962, she competed as Miss Southern Alameda County in the Miss California beauty pageant, winning the dancing category.

She met Neil A. Sorensen during her sophomore year at UC Berkeley; she was in the cheerleading pom-pom squad during 1961–64, serving as the squad leader and choreographer during the last two years, and he was a student director of the University of California Marching Band and the associated Straw Hat Band. Sorensen joined the sorority Kappa Delta. She graduated in 1964 with a bachelor's degree in social science. Neil and Jacki married in January 1965, and he joined the U.S. Air Force later that year. He trained in Big Spring, Texas, while she taught dance in a local Texas studio and interned as an elementary school teacher. Neil's second posting was in Sacramento, California, where Sorensen took graduate classes at CSU Sacramento to get her teaching credential while teaching elementary school. At each air base where they lived, she taught dance classes to women, usually the wives of the airmen. The couple kept cats and had no children.

== Aerobics ==
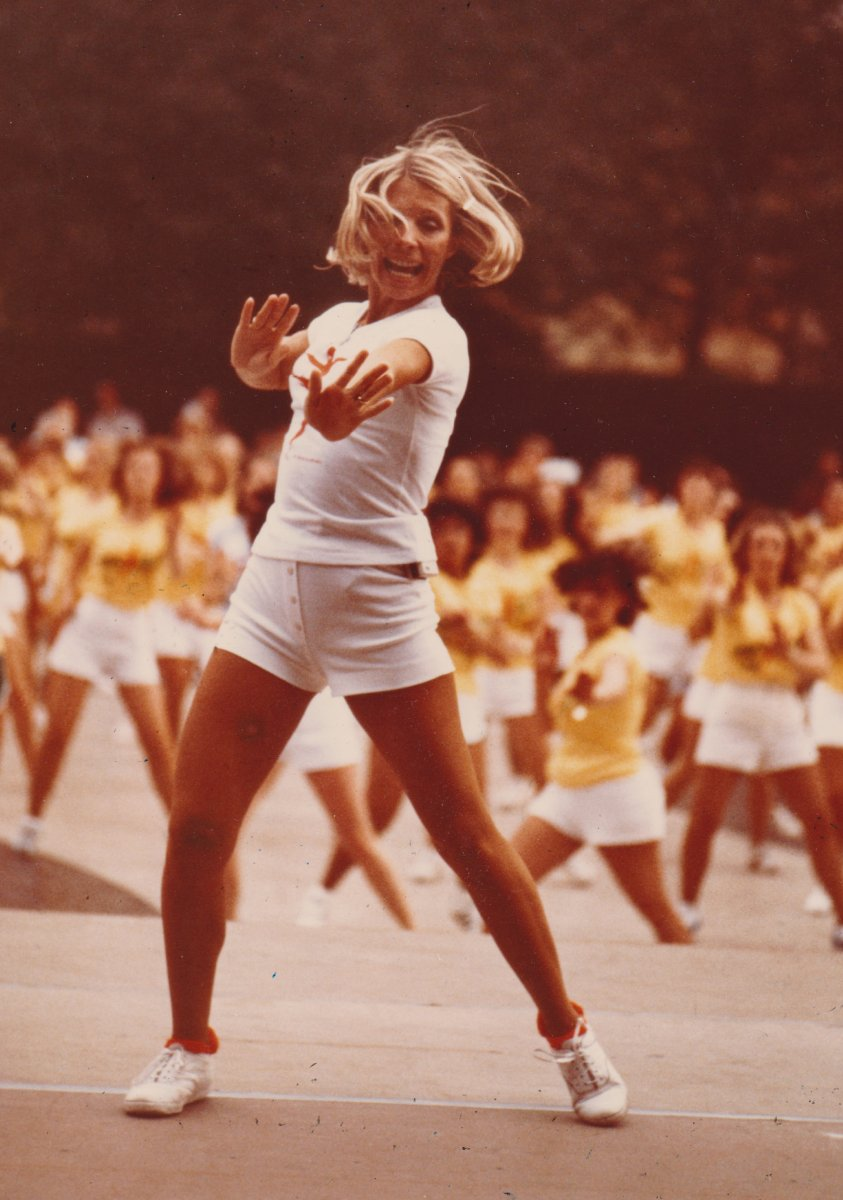
Sorensen leads an Aerobic Dancing, Inc., event in New York. This image was used on the cover of Sorensen's 1979 book.

Sorensen accompanied her husband to his next assignment at Ramey Air Force Base in Puerto Rico in 1969. She found that someone there was already teaching dance classes to Air Force wives, so she determined to start a new exercise program for officers' wives. She studied recent exercise publications including Kenneth H. Cooper's 1968 book Aerobics, which recommended jogging for a healthy heart. Sorensen took his Cooper test and scored "excellent" even though she had never jogged; she realized that her dancing was an equivalent exercise to jogging. She wrote to Cooper and he encouraged her, saying her idea of a dance-based exercise was better, since jogging by itself was not interesting enough for most women to maintain a steady regimen. He recommended that she administer his test to her students, to see how far they could run in 12 minutes. She later said that Cooper's book "changed my life... Dr. Cooper was saying that Americans don't know what fitness is really all about. They're worrying about the little muscles in their inner thighs, when they should be worrying about the most important muscle – their hearts."

Sorensen reassured her students that they would not be judged by their performance or their style. She avoided large mirrors so that the students could feel the exercises internally rather than be distracted by external appearances. Classes were conducted with Sorensen facing away from the students, allowing them to soften the more challenging moves without being scolded. She tested her students regularly to check pulse rate and breathing, and all of them improved after 12 weeks. Agreeing to the request of Air Force producers, she put together a television show called Aerobic Dancing on a TV station in San Juan, recording eight broadcasts per visit because it was a long drive from Ramey AFB. She found that her students reduced their waistlines but they did not usually lose weight.

In 1970, Neil finished his military service, and began selling aviation insurance in South Orange, New Jersey. Before joining him, Sorensen recorded more programs of Aerobic Dancing in Puerto Rico to finish the series. Searching around New Jersey, Sorensen looked for opportunities to teach her aerobic dance classes, but was turned down everywhere until she found a friendly church basement YMCA class in Maplewood, teaching six women, starting in January 1971. These women loved the 12-week program and brought their friends, helping Sorensen slowly pick up a following, finding more students at other YMCA locations, park recreation programs, and through word-of-mouth. Some of her workshops were at Bloomfield College and Seton Hall University, where she also took graduate classes in exercise physiology. When business picked up, Sorensen found herself teaching 25 classes a week in New Jersey. She started running most evenings to calm herself for sleep, four miles in each session, four or five times a week. She ran the 26.2-mile (42.2 km) Atlantic City Marathon organized by the Road Runners Club of America on October 31, 1971, coming in second place in the women's division, behind Nina Kuscsik. Sorensen's elapsed time was about 3.5 hours.

Working toward a master's degree, Sorensen conducted research on aerobic exercise at Seton Hall and at East Stroudsburg University of Pennsylvania. She also served as Seton Hall's women's intramural sports director, and as assistant director of recreation. She gave a demonstration of aerobic dancing at the National Intramural Association convention in April 1971, and Albert "Sonny" Rooker, head of the Texas State Intramural program, asked Sorensen to show her methods to Texas educators. Over the next two years, Sorensen trained and certified more than 200 aerobic dancing instructors in Texas, for which she was accorded the Texas Honor Award by the Governor's Commission on Physical Fitness – she was the first non-Texan to receive this award. Rooker introduced her to C. Carson "Casey" Conrad, the executive director of the President's Council on Physical Fitness and Sports. Conrad invited Sorensen to travel the U.S. as a clinician, bringing her methods to teachers and students at every level from elementary school through college.

Neil Sorensen's job was transferred across the country, and the couple arranged to move to Northridge, California. To prepare for her absence from New Jersey, Sorensen incorporated as Aerobic Dancing, Inc., and she trained five of her first six students to take over. These "clinicians" started their own aerobic dance classes under her banner. Classes were held within rented spaces such as community centers and gyms. Her curriculum was based on the student learning one extended dance routine for 12 weeks, consisting of two or three sessions lasting a total of 90 to 120 minutes per week. There was a new routine every 12 weeks, with themed choreography to new music selections. Sorensen compared this to professional dancers learning a Broadway show, which was more fun than rote exercise. Sorensen required her clinicians to meet an exacting set of standards: they must not be smokers or drinkers, they must maintain their weight within a narrow optimal range relative to height, their hearts must be strong as measured by resting and active heart rates, they must be able to run 1.5 miles (2.4 km) in 12 minutes, they must memorize all of the current dance routines, and they must represent the company while wearing pantyhose under white polyester dance shorts of Sorensen's design. There was no maximum age restriction.

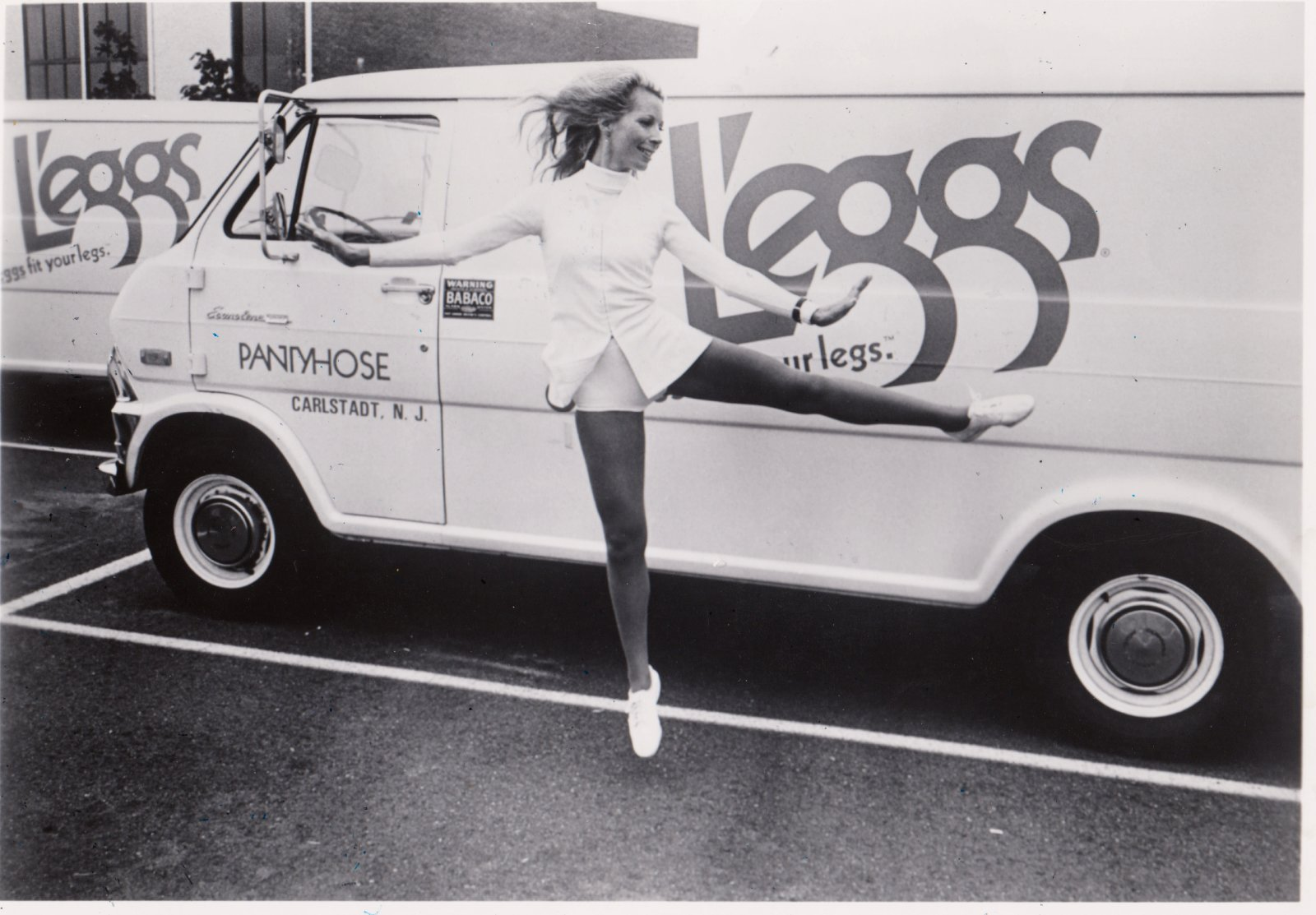
In 1973, Sorensen created a "Sheer Energy" fitness program for L'eggs pantyhose employees.

After moving to California, Sorensen toured American schools on the President's program eight times a year, and in mid-1973 she was hired by L'eggs pantyhose company to formulate and administer an exercise regimen for 600 women who drove for L'eggs and stocked the pantyhose in stores. L'eggs was rolling out the Sheer Energy line in the fall, and Sorensen created a "Sheer Energy" aerobic dancing fitness program for the fleet of distributors. In between President's Council responsibilities, she visited 26 cities over the course of three months, teaching her fitness program to L'eggs representatives.

Also in 1973, Sorensen began recording a series of exercise records for schoolchildren. She attended a cardiovascular health clinic in San Diego given by doctors John Boyer and Fred Kasch, authors of the 1968 book Adult Fitness. Inspired by them, Sorensen opened a new Aerobic Dancing center in San Diego. By May 1975, the company was so successful that Neil shifted careers to manage the business side of Aerobic Dancing, Inc. (ADI). The San Diego location was very active locally, sponsoring a dance-a-thon to fund Special Olympics, a walkathon for the American Heart Association, and a benefit to rebuild the Old Globe Theatre.

By 1977, about 30,000 people had taken classes in Sorensen's Aerobic Dancing. She had formulated 150 different dance routines to keep it interesting for her students, the music ranging from ragtime to contemporary pop and dance. By 1984, the number of routines had passed 1,000.

In September 1979, Sorensen published Aerobic Dancing, promoting it on radio and TV with a book tour through the U.S. Many new students were attracted through classes held in YMCA nonprofits. One year later, she put out an exercise record for adults on vinyl LP. In 1981, ADI reached its peak, counting 1,500 locations, 70 clinicians (supervisor instructors), and 4,000 certified instructors. Some 170,000 students were enrolled, including ones in Japan and Australia. After this, the business steadily lost instructors because it paid an hourly wage rather than allowing entrepreneurship of its franchisees, and because it abandoned the popular YMCA base for dedicated dance studios. ADI was losing ground to Judi Missett's Jazzercise franchises and to the new crop of home video releases inspired by Jane Fonda's Workout in 1982.

Sorensen lent her image to Kraft Foods reduced-calorie salad dressing, appearing in magazine advertisements in 1982, the ad including a Kraft proof-of-purchase offer to obtain the Aerobic Dancing book at a discount. She promoted shoes by Lotto Sport Italia: the $38.95 "Jacki" signature model made in 1982 specifically for aerobic dancing.

Sorensen kept her business operating through the 1980s, releasing another book in 1983, keeping the company headquarters in Northridge while she and her husband moved to Malibu. Her annual music licensing fees were $70,000. Men's routines and classes were added in 1981, and the company reported 28 male instructors among the hundreds of women. Sorensen's husband Neil started exercising for the first time with her in 1983, wearing a t-shirt that said, "Jane Fonda Does Not Work Out Here." Around this time, Sorensen removed the requirement that ADI instructors wear pantyhose.

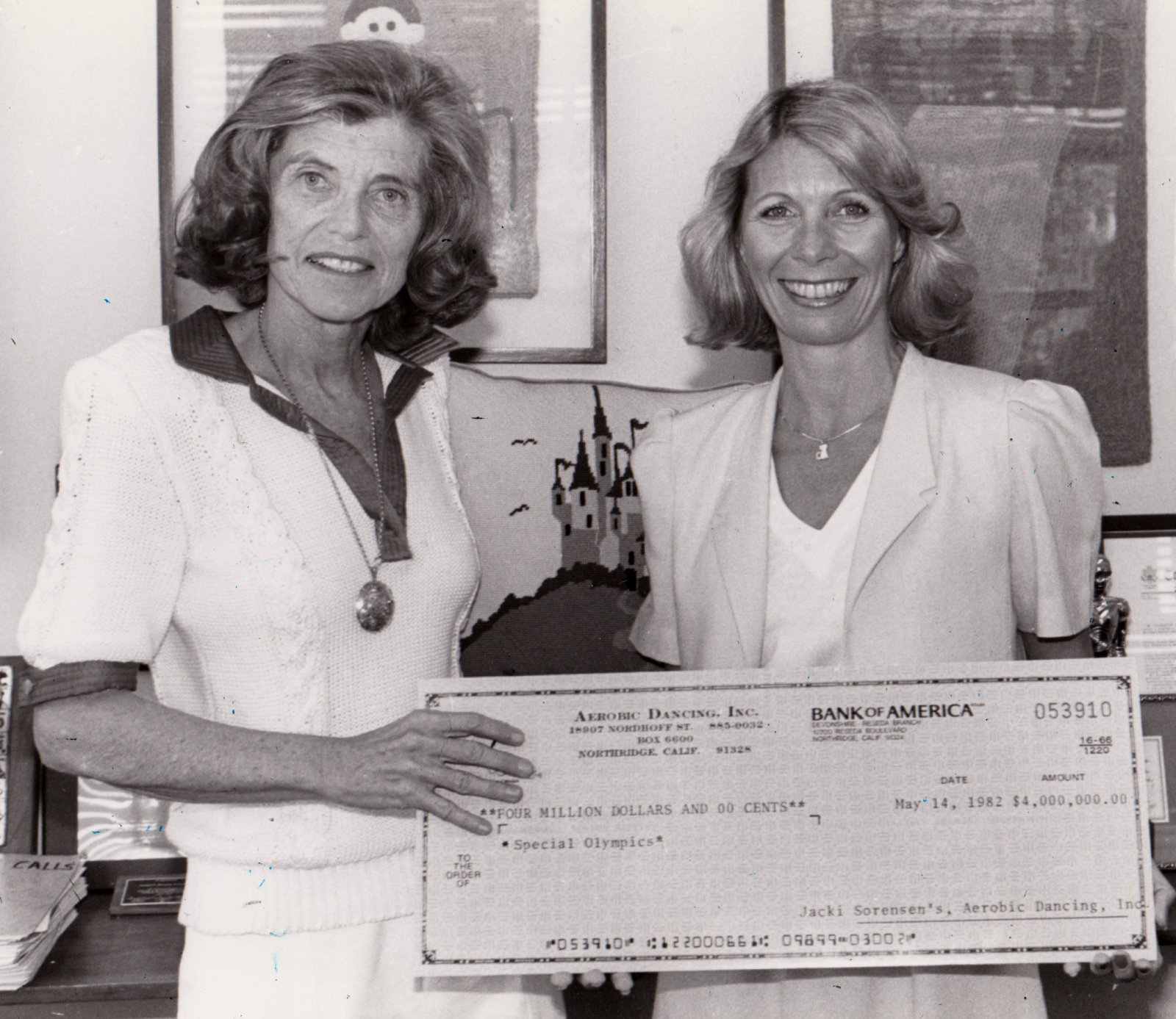
Eunice Kennedy Shriver (left) accepts a $4,000,000 check from Sorensen to benefit Special Olympics in 1982

Sorensen trademarked "Jacki's, Inc." in 1990. The logo's silhouette of a dancer was designed by Carol Woody, and purchased by the company; it is used on branded clothing and exercise gear. Sorensen introduced StrongStep by 1992, her take on step aerobics. Today, Sorensen's aerobic dancing style is taught in Jacki's Dance and StrongStep classes in Australia, Japan and the U.S.

== Honors and legacy ==
Sorensen won the Texas Honor Award in August 1974 for "outstanding contribution to fitness" in Texas. She served the White House for six years in the 1970s as a clinician associated with the President's Council on Physical Fitness and Sports. She served the Women's Sports Foundation on their advisory committee starting in 1978. In 1979 she signed a letter urging the president to support Title IX legislation which would ensure American girls receive the same physical education opportunities as boys. LeRoy Neiman painted a portrait of Sorensen in motion, and the painting was published on the cover of the Fall 1981 issue of Sorensen's Aerobic Dancing in-house magazine. She was honored by the IDEA Health and Fitness Association with their first Lifetime Fitness Achievement Award in 1985. The National Fitness Hall of Fame inducted Sorensen in 2007. In 2012, Sorensen was honored with a Lifetime Achievement Award from the President's Council on Sports, Fitness, and Nutrition.

== Aerobics publications ==
- A Fitness Experience: Continuous Rhythmic Involvement For Classroom Fun & Fitness – 1973 double-LP exercise record for children, beginning level. Kimbo Educational Records 1110
- Jacki Sorensen Presents: Have Fun! Keep Fit! – 1973 double-LP exercise record for children, advanced level. Kimbo Educational Records 1120
- Jacki Sorensen Presents: Aerobic Dancing For Physical Education – 1978 double-LP exercise record for children, advanced level. Kimbo Educational Records 1125
- Jacki Sorensen Presents: Elementary Aerobic Dancing For Physical Education – 1978 double-LP exercise record for children, beginning level. Kimbo Educational Records 1126
- Aerobic Dancing – 1979 book, co-author Bill Bruns. Rawson, Wade
- Aerobic Dancing – 1980 exercise record. Kimbo Educational Records 1127
- Jacki Sorensen's Aerobic Dancing –The Original – 1982 exercise record. Lakeside Records 30005
- Jacki Sorensen's Aerobic Dancing – Encore – 1983 exercise record. Lakeside Records 30006
- Jacki Sorensen's Aerobic Dancing – Encore – 1983 exercise video on VHS. MCA Home Video
- Jacki Sorensen's Aerobic Lifestyle Book – 1983 book, co-author Bill Bruns. Poseidon Press ISBN 9780671456160
- Jacki Sorensen's California Workout – 1989 exercise video on VHS. Comar
