= Pauline Potts =

Scientist and physical therapist

Colonel Pauline "Polly" Potts (1926 – 4 June 2013) was a scientist and physical therapist assisting with a space program, best known for co-creating aerobics.

Potts studied her BSc and MSc from Southern Illinois University then studied a Physical Therapy Degree offered by the US Army Medical Field Services School in Texas. After graduating she acted at the chief of Physical Therapy in various US Airforce hospitals, eventually becoming a Colonel. Potts then became the physical therapist developing exercise programs for weightless environment for astronauts during space exploration, including the project Mercury. Potts is best known for co-developing the exercise technique of aerobics with Kenneth H. Cooper, who published a book on the topic in 1968
