= Cathe Friedrich =

- Born: July 20, 1964 (age 61); Glassboro, New Jersey, U.S.
- Occupations: Personal trainer, group fitness instructor, entrepreneur
- Website: http://cathe.com/

Cathe Friedrich, born July 20, 1964, is an American ACE certified group fitness instructor, personal trainer and entrepreneur from Glassboro, New Jersey. Since releasing her first fitness video in 1989, Friedrich has released over 190 fitness videos. For several years she has taught fitness classes on the now defunct FitTV. She is the co-owner of Four Seasons Health Club in Glassboro, New Jersey, where she regularly teaches fitness classes. In 2011 she was inducted into the National Fitness Hall of Fame.
