= Fitness boot camp =

Type of group physical training program

A fitness boot camp is a type of group physical training program that may be conducted by gyms, personal trainers or other organizations. These programs are designed to build strength and fitness through a variety of types of exercise. The activities and format may be loosely modeled on aspects of fitness training used in the military and the trainers themselves may be former military personnel.

Indoor and outdoor boot camp workouts became popular in the United States in the late 1990s. Fitness boot camps as outdoor group fitness classes grew in popularity in the 2000s. These originated independently in Australia, the United States, the United Kingdom, and Canada.

== History ==
Military forces have emphasized fitness since ancient times.

Athletics competitions were held about 1812 at the Royal Military College, Sandhurst, and the Royal Military Academy, Woolwich held an organised competition in 1849. In 1860 Archibald MacLaren opened a gymnasium at the University of Oxford, England and instituted a training regimen for Captain Frederick Hammersley and 12 non-commissioned officers at the university. This regimen was assimilated into the training of the British Army, which formed the Army Gymnastic Staff in 1861 and made sport an important part of military life.

The term "boot" originates from U.S. Navy and Marine recruits in the Spanish–American War (1898) who wore leggings called boots; these recruits were trained in "boot" camps. Military-style training was used in the late nineteenth century in the United States at the Elmira Reformatory to rehabilitate civilian prisoners and for U.S. military prisoners during and after World War II.

Dr. Bill Orban developed the Royal Canadian Air Force Exercise Plans in 1961, a fitness plan for military personnel that sold 23 million copies to the public. U.S. Air Force Colonel Kenneth Cooper's wrote Aerobics in 1968 and a mass-market version The New Aerobics in 1979. These publications by Orban and Cooper helped to launch modern fitness culture.

Correctional boot camps were used in New Zealand from 1971 to 1981 and have been used in the United States since 1983.

A recreational "Boot Camp Workout" audio compact cassette recorded by a U.S. Marine Corps drill instructor was released in 1984. Indoor "boot camp workouts" at health clubs around the U.S. were popular in 1998. Fitness boot camps as outdoor fitness group classes developed independently in Australia in 1991 (Original Bootcamp), the United States in the 1990s, (Note: The 1998 news articles cited describe "Now – after decades devoted to an explosion of diverse fitness options – these low-tech, low (or no) cost basic training tools are back. Calisthenics are the mainstay of "boot camp workouts," one of the hottest classes at trendy fitness clubs. New books and videos feature military-style shape-up routines, and there's a boom in outdoor programs led by drill sergeant-inspired instructors who bark their "maggot" charges through basic training regimens." The LinkedIn profile cited mentions a "Corporate fitness and wellness education and facilitation" business from 1993 to 2008 that included "corporate fitness boot camps and outdoor exercise", but the main activity of this business is not described as a fitness boot camp and the concept of an Outward Bound course had existed since 1941 in the United Kingdom.) the United Kingdom in 1999 (British Military Fitness), and Canada in 2001 (The Original Boot Camp). Outdoor group fitness classes such as these have been growing in popularity ever since and have become a distinct commercial market within the fitness industry.

In the United States, the television series Boot Camp aired in 2001. In the United Kingdom, reality television program Celebrity Fit Club, which involved boot camp-style fitness, aired from 2002 to 2006. The series was brought over to the United States in 2005 as Celebrity Fit Club which aired until 2010.

== Format ==
Boot camp training often commences with dynamic stretching and running, followed by a wide variety of interval training, including lifting weights/objects, pulling rubber TRX straps, pushups/situps, plyometrics, and various types of intense explosive routines. Sessions usually finish with yoga stretching. Many other exercises using weights and/or bodyweight, similar to CrossFit routines, are used to lose body fat, increase cardiovascular efficiency, increase strength, and help people get into a routine of regular exercise. Many programs offer nutrition advice as well. It is called "boot camp" because it trains groups of people, may be outdoors and may involve physical training similar to that used by the military or activities borrowed from military basic training.

The term "boot camp" is currently used in the fitness industry to describe group fitness classes that promote fat loss, camaraderie, and team effort. They are designed to push people a little bit further than they would normally push themselves in the gym alone. Boot Camps are sometimes organized outdoors in parks using bodyweight exercises like push-ups, squats, suspension training and burpees, interspersed with running and competitive games. The idea is that everyone involved works at their own pace as they team up and work towards one goal, either in pairs, small teams of three or four, or even two teams head on.

Boot camps provide social support for those taking part. This provides a different environment for those exercisers who get bored in a gym and so find it hard to develop a habit of exercise. Participants make friends and socialize as they exercise, although how strict the trainers or drill instructors in charge can be will depend on the company running the camp. Members of fitness boot camps are usually tested for fitness on the first day and then retested at the end of the camp, which usually runs for between 4 and 6 weeks.

Fitness boot camps are often based on the military style of training, although that has started changing over the last few years. An advantage of a boot camp is that the large group dynamic will often help motivate the participants. A growing trend in fitness boot camps are the indoor locations which prove to be climate proof and provide a better workout environment for the members. Additionally, some camps include extracurricular fitness activities off-site.

There are many other benefits of a fitness boot camp, which includes mental health. It has long been known that regular aerobic exercise can help to reduce high blood pressure, hypertension and combat stress. Part of this is due to the release of endorphins, which act as a mood elevator.

Some "Holistic Bootcamps" provide the mental coaching required to sustain motivation after people leave the camp. Themed fitness bootcamps often consist of the use of one particular training implement to the exclusion of others. Kettlebells are the preferred tool for kettlebell fitness bootcamps run by RKC instructors and TRX suspension trainers are the preferred tools for TRX instructors. Boxing themed fitness bootcamps often use heavy bags. The use of themes varies widely between fitness bootcamps and their instructors according to the preferences between the instructor and the needs and likes of the clientele.

== See also ==
- High-intensity interval training
