= Outdoor fitness =

Exercise undertaken outdoors

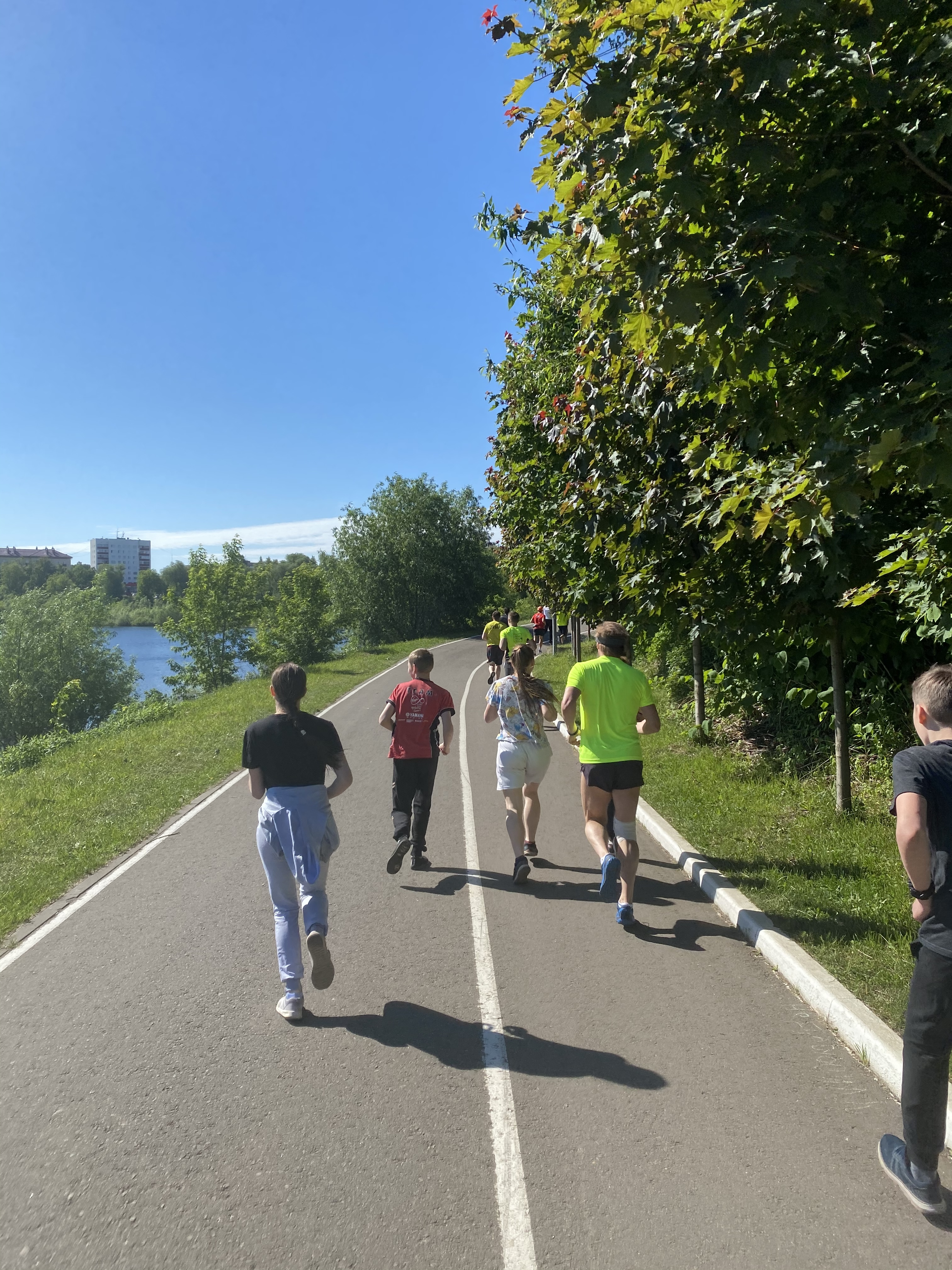
Runners at a Parkrun event in Russia, in 2021

Outdoor fitness consists of exercise undertaken outside a building for the purpose of improving physical fitness. It contrasts with exercise undertaken inside a gym or health club for the same purpose. The activity may be undertaken in a park, in the wilderness, or other outdoor location. The popularity of outdoor fitness grew rapidly in the second-half of the twentieth century and grew as a commercial consumer market in the twenty-first century.

== History ==
In nineteenth-century Germany, Turnplatz, an outdoor space for gymnastics, were promoted by German educator Friedrich Jahn and the Turners, a political and gymnastic movement. After the Second World War, as people did less exercise in their daily and work lives, individualistic, health-oriented physical and recreational activities such as jogging began to prevail. The Royal Canadian Air Force Exercise Plans, developed by Dr. Bill Orban and published in 1961, and Kenneth Cooper's book "Aerobics" (1968) and mass-market version "The New Aerobics" (1979) helped to launch modern fitness culture. There was a running boom in the 1970s and outdoor fitness trails were developed in the USA and Europe. However, most of the growth in the fitness industry was through indoor gyms and health clubs.

Outdoor fitness boot camps developed in Australia, the United States and the United Kingdom in the 1990s and Canada in 2001. In the mid-2000s, outdoor fitness began to grow rapidly as a commercial consumer market as outdoor group fitness classes led by a personal trainer or a fitness professional became a popular form of outdoor exercise. In the early 2010s, a variety of training courses for fitness professionals and certifications for companies specialising in outdoor fitness developed. Outdoor fitness can be studied as a specialism of exercise physiology. The trend towards outdoor fitness led to a proliferation of outdoor gyms.

Growing participation was seen in organized events that expanded internationally such as Parkruns, Tough Mudder and Be Military Fit and sports such as triathlon and cycling. Street workouts have also become a popular outdoor fitness activity is some countries, with a world championship taking place since 2011. In recent years, more and schools have discovered the outdoors as a medium for education. Lakes, valleys and mountains are used for specific academic instruction in the realm of science and biology.

Health benefits Outdoor activities such as running may provide both physical and mental health benefits. Running on dirt trails or other soft surfaces can help reduce the impact each step takes on your joints. Uneven terrain can also strengthen muscles that help with balance. Along with that, exercising in nature not only gives you a break from electronic devices but also everyday stress

== See also ==
- Calisthenics
- Exercise trends
- Freerunning
- History of physical training and fitness
- Outdoor recreation
- Parkour
- Street workout
