= Calisthenics (Australia) =

Team-based competitive performing art

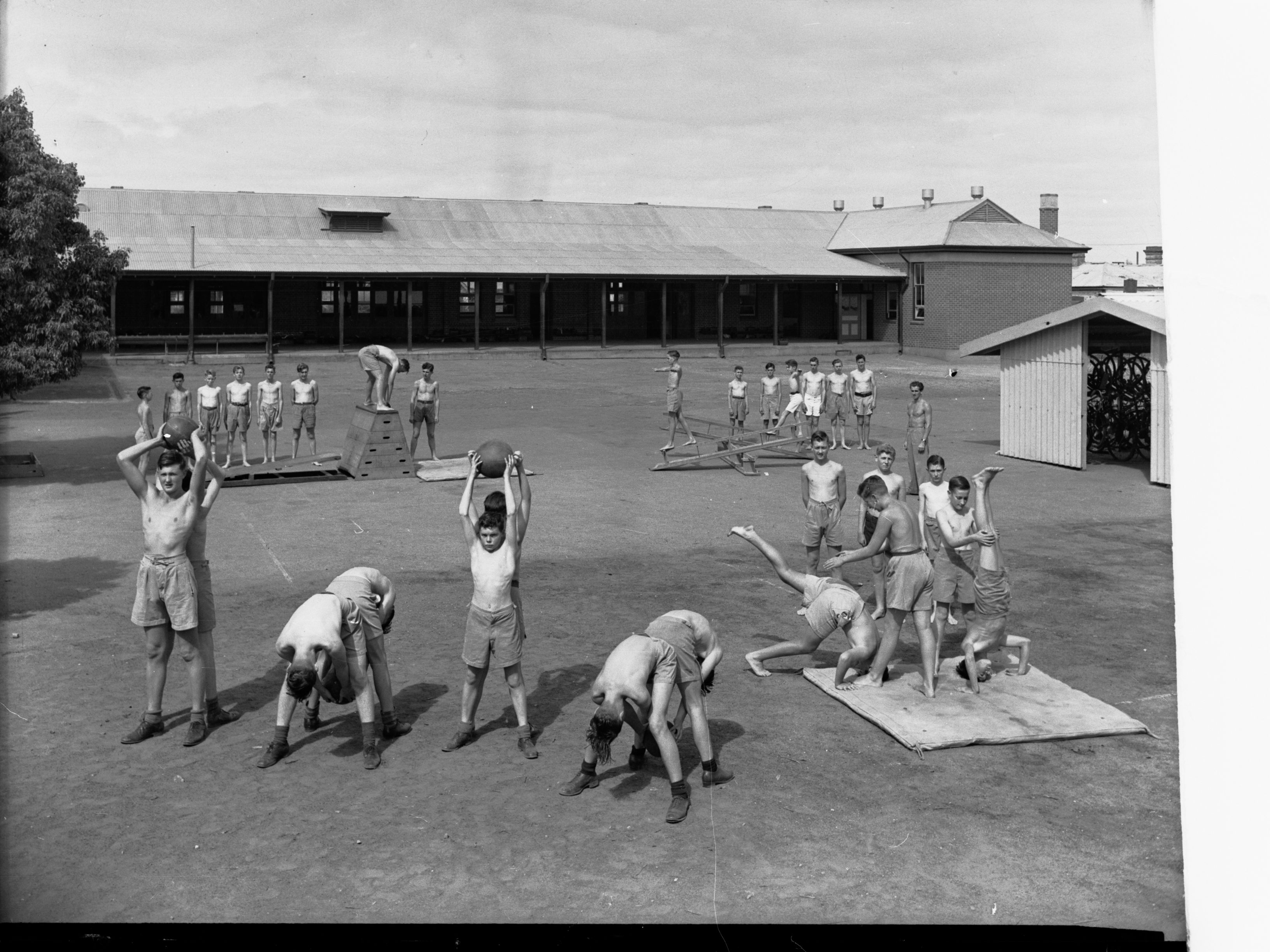
Calisthenics class at the Goodwood Boys Technical School, 1945

In Australia, calisthenics (also known as Australian calisthenics) is a team-based competitive performing art taking elements of rhythmic gymnastics and ballet combined with a strong emphasis on theatricality (both musical and dramatic), costume, dance and musical interpretation. Since the 1950s Calisthenics has been an entirely female art form, however males have recently been re-introduced in the younger age groups. The art form was created entirely in Australia and can be easily differentiated from traditional calisthenics by its focus on competition and choreographed theatrical performance instead of simple synchronized exercise. The word itself comes from the Greek words for beauty and strength. Calisthenics is currently practiced in all states except Tasmania and has recently been introduced in New Zealand.

== Format ==
Calisthenics consists of performing a variety of 'items' which are usually presented at eisteddfod-like stage competitions. Currently the items performed in Calisthenics are: Figure March, Club Swinging, Free Exercises, Rod Exercises, Aesthetics, and a couple other 'Fancy Items'. Fancy items are those items which typically focus on the theatrical performance other aspects, and are included on a rotational basis (i.e. not all performed every year). Fancy items include Song and Dance, Rhythmic (similar to Aesthetics), Stage Medley, Dance Arrangement, Folk Dance and Calisthenics Revue, usually the same moves in different sequence per song. At the most elite level, Calisthenics competitors are required to have some knowledge of flexibility, strength, balance and control, precision, technique, execution and an idea of Choreography is also required.

Competitors wear costumes often designed and sewn by the parents for the year's competition items. The competitors also wear heavy theatrical make up to emphasize expressions on stage. Team competition is the main form of competition, however solo competitions including "Graceful Solo" (a solo similar to that of Aesthetics) and "Solo and Duo" (a solo that is similar to that of Free Exercises, but must be an equal blend of that and dance) are also a part of the performance art. For example, one of the highlights of the year for the elite solo competitor is a competition category called "Most Graceful Girl".

== Age groups ==
Competitors are currently grouped into six sections based on their age as at 31 December in the year that the competition is held. The Australian Calisthenic Federation (ACF) rules state in relation to age "Flexible rule for each state" but quotes the following groupings in the rule book:

- Tinies (7 and under)
- Sub-juniors (10 and under)
- Juniors (13 and under)
- Intermediates (16 and under)
- Seniors (17 years and over - no maximum)
- Masters (26 years and over)
- Gaudion (for competitors greater than Masters)

There is also a change (depending on the club) that if you are a top age of your current group and the group above you need more dancers then they may ask you to move up to help out but also get experience. This can occur from the age of Tinies all the way through.

== Items ==
There are a number of items performed from which the aggregate is awarded. In most competitions where there is a single adjudicator, first place is awarded 6 points, second is awarded 4 points, 2 points for third place and one aggregate point for Honourable Mention, an overall aggregate and runner up award being given to the highest scoring teams. In all items the team must consist of at least eight competitors on stage at all times to avoid a 5-point penalty. Furthermore, they must have a minimum of 6 competitors on stage in order to be able to compete :

=== Figure March ===
A team of over eight competitors displays intricate marching figures and patterns, while highlighting good deportment and teamwork. Similar to that seen of 'Marching Girls' rhythm and precision within the team must be identical and is a basic requirement. A well choreographed set will display many complex patterns and be very entertaining.

=== Club Swinging ===
Club Swinging is one hard skill for a calisthenic participant to learn. It requires no specific physical attributes, but pure determination and much practice. A team of eight or more competitors is required to execute complex swings in unison with perfect rhythm in a planning action.

Rhythm is a very important aspect, as each arm and club swing independently of the other, so exact rhythm is extremely important.

Advanced routines include moving through various patterns and executing leg movements.

=== Free Exercises ===
Commonly referred to as 'freearm' in Victoria, while others refer to it as 'Free Exercises.' Probably the most physically challenging and impressive element to watch. This item is typically performed with no apparatus and is a cross between traditional calisthenic movements (lunges, squats, arm raises, etc.) and gymnastic movements such as headstands and walkovers. Great flexibility and control make up this exciting routine. Younger sections start with simple basic movements that must be correct in detail and uniformity. As the item progresses through the age groups, it becomes more challenging according to the competitors' strength and abilities.

=== Rod Exercises ===
Commonly known as 'rods', this is a challenging item. Based on similar movements to 'freearm' with the added challenge of manipulating a long rod. Rods are very much like twirling baton you just don't throw and spin them

The rod itself is made of metal, 3/8" to 5/8" diameter. The length is taken from the centre of the chest to the end of the middle finger when the arm is in side raise position.

Although the rod is the focal point, the manipulation of this apparatus while demonstrating flexible use of body and legs, highlights the concentration and co-ordination required by the performers.

There are two types of grips used. In Under Grip, the rod is gripped firmly with the back of the hands turned towards the body. In Top Grip, the rod is gripped with the knuckles turned outwards.

Some states include 'Dance Rods' in their core items, with a higher emphasis on complex dance footwork and movement.

=== Aesthetics ===
Aesthetic exercises are graceful form of dance, similar to Ballet, where the female competitors wear long flowing skirts and interpret music with a variety of facial and body expressions. Music chosen is often classical pieces and should suit the age group to allow interpretation to be expressed. Movements should be soft and flowing while maintaining poise, strength, and at times demonstrating flexibility. Arm and feet positions are taken from Classical Ballet with a softer feel. Elevation is not permitted. Meaning that both feet are not to be lifted off of the ground at the same time, unless a team lift is being done.

=== Song and Dance ===
This item is predominately seen in the older sections. Combining singing with modern dance, it is important to make sure the theme of the song is carried through to the style of dance steps, and costume choice. Equal weight is placed on both the singing quality and correct dance technique. Therefore, the choreography should include an equal amount of singing and dancing. Overall presentation, facial expression and style, also play a key role in presenting a successful Song and Dance.

=== Action Song ===
Performed in the younger sections, an alternative to Song and Dance, involving singing and acting to tell the audience a story. Using props and colourful costumes, pupils sing "age appropriate" songs with singing the most important aspect of the item.

=== Folk Dance ===
Performed in the younger age groups, pupils learn and perform basic steps of a traditional national dance from all around the world. Pupils must display with correct technique and appropriate costuming and music must be followed. This item is no longer being performed

=== Rhythmical Interpretation ===
It is similar to aesthetics, but the performers are permitted to do leaps and jumps. Rhythmics also tells more of a story than aesthetics, with interpretation of a theme part of the adjudication criteria. It is performed in the higher divisions of calisthenics, and requires more physical strength than aesthetics.

=== Rhythmical Aesthetic ===
Rhythmical Aesthetics is a combination of aesthetics and Rhythmical Interpretation. It is very soft, flowing and graceful but must include elevated movements. Most commonly abbreviated as 'razza'.

=== Calisthenics Revue ===
Creativity and entertainment are the keys to this item which allows great freedom in choreographic creativity. Items are often complex and clever and can represent mini-productions. Teams are encouraged to combine aspects of calisthenics with dancing, singing, acting, comedy and clever costuming – all designed to delight and entertain the audience. A key feature of a Revue is to tell a story through the utilisation of calisthenic technique.

=== Dance Arrangement ===
A routine that combines interpretation of a chosen dance genre, focusing on developing spatial awareness, dance, elevation, expression and performance skills.

== Competitions ==
The Australian Calisthenics Federation (ACF) is responsible for the development and maintenance of National rules and regulations, although each state has the ability to apply for flexible rules. Teams are divided into divisions, based on their competitiveness. At the most elite level is the 'Championship' level where girls spend hours practicing and costumes are elaborate. The next most competitive is 'Premier′. Teams are then graded from Division 1 to Division 12. Division 1 being the highest level and 12 being the lowest.

== Calisthenic skills programme ==
Participants may decide to participate in an exam to test them on their calisthenic skill and technique. Exams are held at many levels, allowing both young and old the chance to work on their calisthenic skill.

== History ==
Calisthenics was first pioneered in Australia in the 1890s as a means to keep citizens fit and healthy. In 1903, the Royal South Street Society introduced Calisthenics as a section in its famous eisteddfod in Ballarat.

Australian calisthenics came to prominence during the Victorian Gold Rush. It provided exercises to help city dwellers keep fit. These exercises were often combined with apparatus to keep their wrists, elbows and shoulders supple. Clubs and rods are currently being used for this.

As the primary purpose of the form slowly moved from exercise to performance art, musical accompaniment gradually enhanced performances and it slowly became an integral part of the art form.

Public classes began in the 1880s. By 1903 the Royal South Street Society introduced Calisthenics to its famous Eisteddfod in Ballarat. The competition in Ballarat is still the focus for many clubs in Australia. Calisthenics was introduced into Victorian State Schools in the 1930s.

The art form became so popular that calisthenics clubs spread rapidly, mostly in Victoria and South Australia. It achieved national attraction when Victorian and South Australian coaches began moving throughout Australia. Up until the 1940s Calisthenics featured both male and female teams and then male involvement died out and females took over the art. Male were recently re-introduced in the younger age groups (aged 14 and under). The format and types of items performed in Calisthenics has changed many times over the years and this has gradually evolved to what we know today.

In 2010 a challenge was made to the rules preventing males over the age of 14 from competing, however this was over ruled, due to an allowance in the Equal Opportunity law.

Calisthenics featured in the TV series The Edge of the Bush, where it is said to be "a dynamic art form where gymnastics and dance come together and friendships and confidence are fostered". The use of calisthenics as a key feature of the setting was inspired by its prominence in Essendon.

== See also ==
- Alexander Technique
- Bodyweight exercise
- Fitness trail
- Gymnastics
- Pilates
- 5BX
- The 5 essential calisthenic movements

== External reading ==
Australian Calisthenic Federation (ACF) National Rules effective 1 January 2014
