= Cooper test =

Physical fitness test

The Cooper test is a physical fitness test that measures an individual's cardiovascular endurance. It was created for the United States Armed Forces by physician Kenneth H. Cooper in 1968. The test is performed by running as long a distance as possible within 12 minutes. The results are based on the distance the participant ran, their age, and their gender.

The test is more difficult to complete in larger groups. For athletes, the length of the run is considered to be that of a short distance run, since everything above 3 km is rated "long distance"—which means the runner will primarily use their "red", slow oxidative muscle cells.

== Interpretation of results ==
The following is an example of the many tables that exist for the test:

Cooper Test
Age	M/F	Excellent	Above Average	Average	Below Average	Poor
11-12	M	> 2600 m	2250–2600 m	2050–2250 m	1950–2050 m	< 1950m
11-12	F	> 1950 m	1750–1950 m	1500–1750 m	1300–1500 m	< 1300 m
13-14	M	> 2700 m	2400–2700 m	2200–2399 m	2100–2199 m	< 2100 m
13-14	F	> 2000 m	1900–2000 m	1600–1899 m	1500–1599 m	< 1500 m
15-16	M	> 2800 m	2500–2800 m	2300–2499 m	2200–2299 m	< 2200 m
15-16	F	> 2100 m	2000–2100 m	1700–1999 m	1600–1699 m	< 1600 m
17-19	M	> 3000 m	2700–3000 m	2500–2699 m	2300–2499 m	< 2300 m
17-19	F	> 2300 m	2100–2300 m	1800–2099 m	1700–1799 m	< 1700 m
20-29	M	> 2800 m	2400–2800 m	2200–2399 m	1600–2199 m	< 1600 m
20-29	F	> 2700 m	2200–2700 m	1800–2199 m	1500–1799 m	< 1500 m
30-39	M	> 2700 m	2300–2700 m	1900–2299 m	1500–1899 m	< 1500 m
30-39	F	> 2500 m	2000–2500 m	1700–1999 m	1400–1699 m	< 1400 m
40-49	M	> 2500 m	2100–2500 m	1700–2099 m	1400–1699 m	< 1400 m
40-49	F	> 2300 m	1900–2300 m	1500–1899 m	1200–1499 m	< 1200 m
50+	M	> 2400 m	2000–2400 m	1600–1999 m	1300–1599 m	< 1300 m
50+	F	> 2200 m	1700–2200 m	1400–1699 m	1100–1399 m	< 1100 m

Cooper test (Experienced athletes)
Gender	Excellent	Above Average	Average	Below Average	Poor
Male	> 3700 m	3400–3700 m	3100–3399 m	2800–3099 m	< 2800 m
Female	> 3000 m	2700–3000 m	2400–2699 m	2100–2399 m	< 2100 m

=== VO2 max estimate ===
The results can be correlated with VO_{2} max by inverting the linear regression values presented in the original publication.

Formula:

$$\mathrm{VO_2\; max} = {d_{12} - 504.9 \over 44.73}$$

where d_{12} is distance (in metres) covered in 12 minutes, alternatively

$$\mathrm{VO_2\; max} = {35.97 \cdot d(\text{miles})_{12} - 11.29}$$

where d(miles)_{12} is distance (in miles) covered in 12 minutes.

== Practical use ==
When used in a military, it is difficult to administer the test and monitor the results. Not all military bases have a running track, and tracking soldiers' laps and positions after 12 minutes may be considered difficult. Testing is easier to administer when the distance is fixed and the finishing time is measured. In his original book, Cooper also provided an alternate version of the test, based on the time to complete a 1.5 mile run.

Most armies and police agencies of the world use a fixed distance. For example, the British Army uses 1.5 miles, the Australian Army uses 2.4 kilometers, the United States Army uses 2 miles, and the United States Marine Corps uses 3 miles. For each base, the course is measured and local corrections (elevation, conditions, etc.) are applied. Soldiers are sent off in waves, and timed over the finish line by some PTIs with a stopwatch.

For personal trainers, the Cooper test is a reliable and repeatable method for measuring a client's progress when carried out on a treadmill.

As a standard test, this test should to be performed only under standard conditions:

- Between 50 and 75 °F (10 to 25 °C) with 75% maximum humidity.
- On a standard 400 m Tartan track or similar.
- The candidate should not suffer from respiratory problems.

The test formula given by Cooper is not considered to be useful for untrained pupils. Regression analysis, in a study of sedentary male subjects, revealed a significant correlation (r = 0.93, P<0.001) with direct VO2Max measurements with a modified formula:

$$\mathrm{VO_2\; max} = {21.01 \cdot d(\text{kilometers})_{12} - 11.04}$$

where d(kilometers)_{12} is distance (in kilometers) covered in 12 minutes.

== Football referees ==
The Cooper test was one of the most commonly used fitness tests to measure the fitness levels of both amateur and professional football referees, including referees from the FA (English Football Association). More recently, many countries have decided to stop relying on the Cooper Test, claiming that the Cooper test does not correlate well to a real football match, where players run short sprints rather than at a regular pace. Thus it may not truly indicate if a referee will be able to perform well in a football match. All FIFA referees are now required to pass the HI Intensity Fitness Test. National associations are gradually requiring some of their top-tier officials to do the HI Intensity Fitness Test also. Lower level referees are often given a choice to either perform the HI Intensity Fitness Test or the Cooper Test. Nevertheless, the recent trend seems to indicate that the Cooper Test is slowly being phased out.

== See also ==
- Training effect
