= William Kraus =

American cardiologist and academic

William E. Kraus
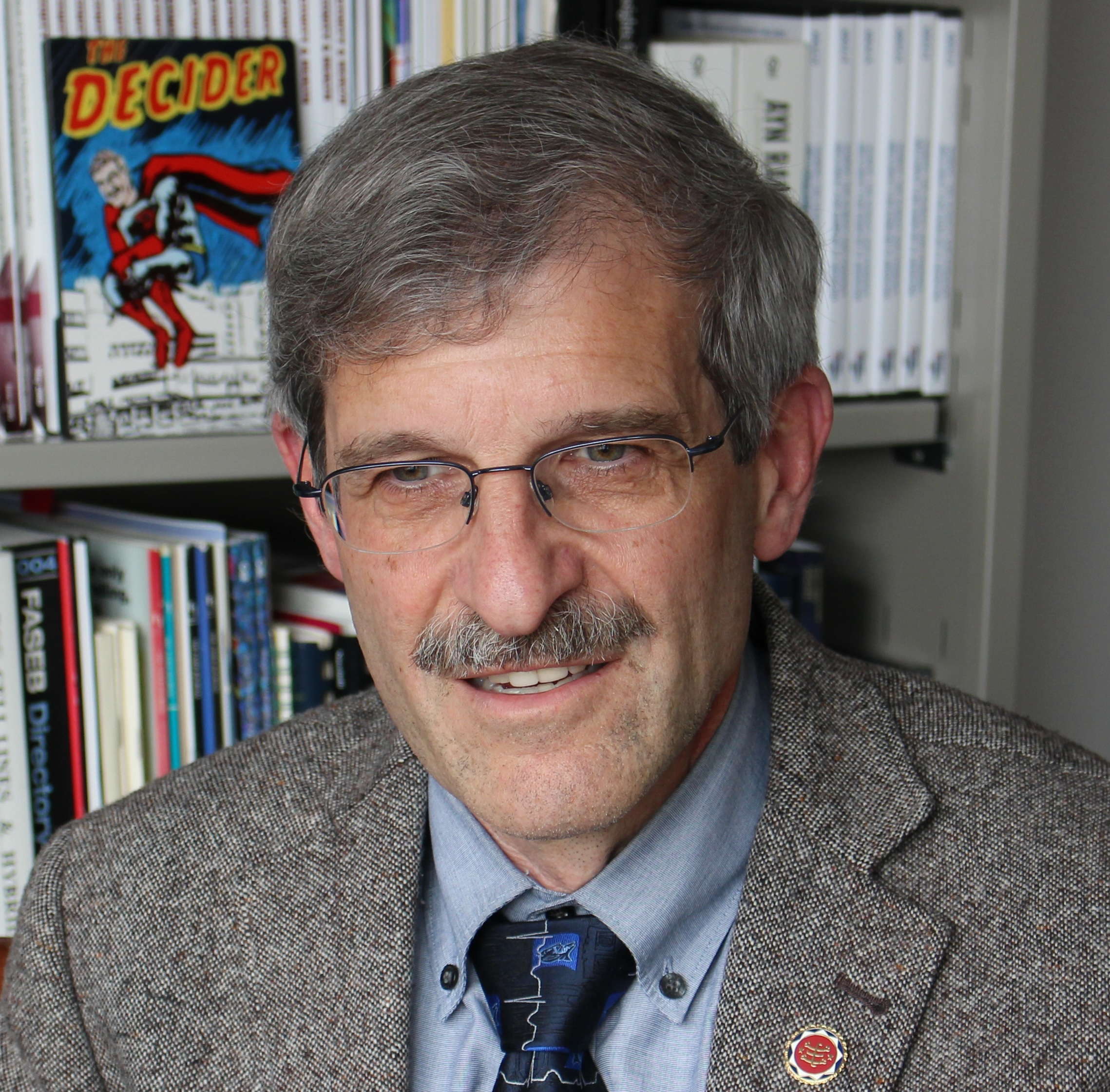
- William E. Kraus in Office (2014)
- Born: William Erle Kraus; December 3, 1954 (age 71); Akron, Ohio, U.S.
- Education: Harvard College (A.B., magna cum laude); Duke University School of Medicine (M.D.)
- Occupations: Cardiologist, professor, physician-scientist
- Employer: Duke University
- Known for: Exercise physiology research STRRIDE trials Physical Activity Guidelines for Americans
- Title: Richard and Pat Johnson University Distinguished Professor of Cardiovascular Genomics
- Awards: AACVPR Michael L. Pollock Established Investigator Award (2016); ACSM Citation Award (2024)
- Website: medicine.duke.edu/profile/william-erle-kraus

William Erle Kraus (born December 3, 1954) is an American cardiologist, physician-scientist, and professor. He is the Richard and Pat Johnson University Distinguished Professor of Cardiovascular Genomics in the Division of Cardiology, Department of Medicine, at Duke University School of Medicine. He is also a professor in the Duke Molecular Physiology Institute, the School of Nursing, and the Department of Biomedical Engineering at Duke University.

Kraus specializes in preventive cardiology, cardiac rehabilitation, and the effects of physical activity on cardiometabolic health. His research has influenced public health guidelines on exercise and explored both the benefits and potential risks of physical activity.

== Early life and education ==
Kraus was born in Akron, Ohio. He earned an A.B. degree magna cum laude in Astronomy and Astrophysics from Harvard College in 1977. He received his M.D. from Duke University School of Medicine in 1983.

== Career ==
Kraus has been a faculty member at Duke University since the late 1980s.

=== Academic appointments ===
He progressed from Associate in the Division of Cardiology (1988–1989), to Assistant Professor (1989–2001), Associate Professor (2001–2006), and full Professor since 2006. In 2017 he was named the Richard and Pat Johnson University Distinguished Professor of Cardiovascular Genomics.

He also holds professorships in the Duke Molecular Physiology Institute, the School of Nursing, and the Department of Biomedical Engineering.

=== Clinical roles ===
Kraus is a practicing cardiologist specializing in preventive cardiology, cardiac rehabilitation, and sports cardiology for mature athletes. He has served as Medical Director of the Duke Cardiac Rehabilitation Program since 1994.

He previously directed the Duke Center for Living (1996–1999), an outpatient facility focused on cardiovascular disease prevention through lifestyle interventions.

=== Research ===
Kraus's research centers on the physiological and molecular mechanisms by which exercise training improves cardiometabolic health, the role of skeletal muscle adaptations, gene–environment interactions, and personalized preventive cardiology. He has investigated epigenetic mechanisms, detraining effects, dose-response relationships, and various exercise modalities to understand their impact on physical fitness, body composition, insulin action, lipoprotein metabolism, and metabolic syndrome.

His work explores variability in exercise responses, including cases where physical activity may lead to adverse effects on cardiovascular risk factors. Kraus has also shown that sporadic bouts of moderate-to-vigorous activity can reduce mortality risk similarly to sustained sessions.

==== Major studies and trials ====
He led the STRRIDE series (Studies of a Targeted Risk Reduction Intervention through Defined Exercise), landmark NIH-funded trials that established dose–response relationships between exercise amount/intensity and improvements in plasma lipoproteins, insulin sensitivity, and other cardiometabolic risk factors. Follow-up studies have shown legacy effects persisting ten years later, with vigorous intensity groups maintaining better cardiorespiratory fitness.

Kraus played a major leadership role in the HF-ACTION trial (Heart Failure: A Controlled Trial Investigating Outcomes of exercise traiNing), providing evidence that supported Medicare reimbursement for cardiac rehabilitation in patients with heart failure.

He served as Study Chair for the multicenter CALERIE trial investigating the effects of sustained calorie restriction on biomarkers of aging and cardiometabolic risk.

He co-authored a 2012 study examining adverse responses to exercise in sedentary adults, finding that a small percentage experience worsening of cardiovascular risk factors despite regular exercise.

He has also participated in the Molecular Transducers of Physical Activity Consortium (MoTrPAC).

==== Influence on policy ====
Kraus was a member of the 2008 and 2018 U.S. Physical Activity Guidelines Advisory Committees. His work on exercise dose–response relationships contributed significantly to the scientific foundation of the Physical Activity Guidelines for Americans, which have been adopted internationally. These guidelines emphasize that inadequate physical activity is linked to substantial health care costs and premature mortality, and they highlight benefits from even brief activity bouts.

=== Professional leadership ===
Kraus is a Fellow of the American College of Cardiology (FACC), American College of Sports Medicine (FACSM), and American Heart Association (FAHA). He served as Vice President (2016–2018), President-Elect (2018–2019), and President (2019–2020) of the American College of Sports Medicine.

== Awards and honors ==
Kraus received the Michael L. Pollock Established Investigator Award from the American Association of Cardiovascular and Pulmonary Rehabilitation in 2016.

He received the American College of Sports Medicine Citation Award in 2024.

He has authored or co-authored more than 450 peer-reviewed publications.
