= John Tett =

Canadian athlete (1916–1974)

John Kearns Tett, DFC & (1916 – 1974) was a Canadian athlete, wartime military pilot, physical fitness educator, and public servant. In the 1950s, he fathered the 5BX (Five Basic Exercises) fitness program developed for the Royal Canadian Air Force (RCAF). The Tett Centre for Creativity and Learning in Kingston, Ontario is named after him.

== Early life and wartime service ==
John Tett, a great-grandson of Benjamin Tett, was born in Kingston, Ontario. His father Arthur, a banker, had enlisted in the Canadian army, but died in England when his son was still an infant. John grew up in Toronto, and became a competitive swimmer and diver; by 1936-37 he was the assistant coach of swimming/diving at the University of Toronto. In July, 1940 he enlisted in the RCAF and subsequently became a pilot officer. In April, 1941 he was posted to No. 103 Squadron RAF in England. Roughly two months later, following a raid on Hamburg, his bomber crash-landed in the North Sea. According to the official Mentioned in Despatches "During the subsequent thirteen hours in which the crew drifted in the dinghy, Pilot Officer Tett offered a source of encouragement to all." For this, and for bravery during other missions over Germany, he was awarded the Distinguished Flying Cross on June 22, 1943. After being repatriated to Canada and helping with RCAF recruitment until the war ended, he was released from service in May, 1945.

== Postwar life and legacy ==
Following the war, "Johnny" Tett was appointed Director of Recreation, Adult Education and Citizenship with the Ontario Department of Education. He then rejoined the RCAF in 1952, as a Special Education Officer with the rank of Wing Commander. His mandate was to establish a directorate and trade for the development of physical fitness, sports and recreation. In 1956 he hired researcher Bill Orban and directed him to devise a program which emphasized the developments of a high level of fitness, but would consume only a relatively small amount of the RCAF personnel's time. Orban's insight was that short bouts of vigorous exercise could be just as effective as longer bouts of moderate exercise for improving fitness. He came up with five basic exercises, four to improve flexibility and strength and one to boost aerobic fitness; none required any equipment at all. The result was the internationally renowned 5BX Program.

J. K. Tett retired from the RCAF in May, 1965. He became the first full-time Director of Parks and Recreation for the municipality of Kingston. In 1971, he urged the city to purchase a former brewery and distillery built by James Morton (Canadian businessman) in the 1820s, a lakeside site which he envisioned as a community arts complex.

Sadly, John K. Tett died before he saw his vision come to fruition. He was reported missing in late August 1974, after his canoe overturned during a storm on Devil Lake, in Frontenac Provincial Park north of Kingston; his body was recovered two weeks later and was buried in the Tett Family cemetery in the village of Newboro, Rideau Lakes township. Kingston's limestone heritage building became known unofficially as "the Tett", and decades later, a development partnership between the city and Queen's University led to its rebirth as the Tett Centre for Creativity and Learning.
