= Be Military Fit =

British outdoor group fitness class company

BMF logo

Be Military Fit, or BMF, is a private company which, at its peak, ran outdoor group fitness classes in 140 public parks and outdoor spaces across the United Kingdom. The company currently operates in 2 venues in London. The classes are predominantly led by former or serving members of the British Armed Forces.

BMF was founded in 1999 as British Military Fitness and pioneered the concept of group classes for outdoor fitness in the United Kingdom. In September 2018, it was purchased by NM Capital and Bear Grylls Ventures and re-branded as Be Military Fit.

== History ==
British Military Fitness (BMF) was founded in 1999 by retired Major Robin Cope (Anglians), Corporal Harry Sowerby (4RGJ) and Corporal William Skinner (10 Para). The idea was born on the film set of Saving Private Ryan in October 1998. Cope suggested the idea of training civilians in parks. He thought that an added emphasis should be made on providing motivation, which was lacking in the majority of those who work out in gyms. Sowerby had just completed his Reservist Army Physical Training Instructors course (PTI) and along with Skinner agreed to join with Cope in this new venture. Each invested £1,000, so with a total of £3,000 BMF was launched. £1,000 was spent on some second hand computers, some money was spent on class equipment such as mats and numbered bibs and £1,000 was spent on one Evening Standard advert. The first-ever BMF class was held in Hyde Park in April or June 1999 (sources vary) and attracted three or ten clients (sources vary). By the end of the year, there were 200 members.

The company expanded rapidly, requiring significant investment in 2002 to avoid bankruptcy. Until about 2005, BMF was the only provider of boot camp or military-style fitness training in the United Kingdom. Growth accelerated across the UK in the mid-2000s, and a spin-off launched in South Africa in 2008. The classes and brand name became recognisable around the country, pioneering the growth in the market for outdoor fitness group classes. The company innovated training and partnerships in the industry and expanded into events and fitness holidays. By 2010 there were 16,000 members at 100 parks, and in 2016 BMF was training 13,000 people weekly, having expanded its venues to 140 parks around the UK.

In September 2018, British Military Fitness was purchased by NM Capital and Bear Grylls Ventures and re-branded as Be Military Fit, still using the acronym BMF. It claims to be Europe's largest outdoor fitness company, training 30,000 people annually. In 2021, the company went into a company voluntary arrangement to secure itself from creditors. BMF was the first to deliver group outdoor fitness classes on a mass scale and has since created an outdoor fitness industry in the UK. It is no longer unusual to witness groups of people exercising in public parks year-round. There are many small-scale competitors to BMF.

== Format ==
Each lesson lasts approximately sixty minutes, and, in order to cater for all abilities, classes are broken up into three ability groups indicated by the wearing of coloured bibs: blue for beginners, red for intermediates and green for advanced.

The first ten minutes of a class are spent warming up, before fifty minutes of intense fitness exercises, which can vary from circuit training, relays, sprints, military activities and team games. The class is punctuated by a quick water break at the midpoint and ends with a five-minute cool-down and stretching session.

Unlike the controlled environment of a gym, lessons vary from class to class with instructors making full use of the surrounding features of the park. Alongside the military fitness classes, BMF also offers running clubs in certain locations.

== See also ==
- Fitness boot camp
- Tough Mudder
- Parkrun
