= Kenneth H. Cooper =

American physician

Kenneth H. Cooper (born March 4, 1931) is an American doctor of medicine and former Air Force lieutenant colonel from Oklahoma, who pioneered the benefits of doing aerobic exercise for maintaining and improving health. In 1966 he coined the term, and his book Aerobics was published in 1968, which emphasized a point system for improving the cardiovascular system. The popular mass market version was The New Aerobics (ISBN 0-553-26874-0), published ten years later.

A further book—with a more comprehensive approach including for example nutrition as well as exercise, The Aerobics Program For Total Well-Being (Bantam Books)—was published in 1982.

== Career ==
Born in Oklahoma City, Cooper completed a 13-year military career in both the army and air force. During his Air Force career, he devised the simple Cooper test, which could conveniently and quickly establish the fitness level of large numbers of people. Originally the distance run in 12 minutes, it correlated well with the existing concept of VO_{2} max. Cooper left the Air Force in 1970, when he and his wife, Millie, moved to Dallas to start his companies.

Cooper is the founder of the non-profit research and education organization, The Cooper Institute, which was opened in 1970. Cooper is also the founder of and chairman at the Cooper Aerobics Center in Dallas, which comprises eight health and wellness entities.

Cooper developed the Smart Snack Ribbon guidelines in 2003 for the Frito-Lay division of PepsiCo.

Cooper has published 19 books that have sold 30 million copies and been translated into 41 languages. Cooper encouraged millions to become active and helped to launch modern fitness culture. He is known as the "father of aerobics".

He and his wife are parents of a son, Tyler, and daughter, Berkley. Cooper has written about the importance of Christian religious faith in his life.

He graduated from the University of Oklahoma (BS, MD) and the Harvard School of Public Health (MPH).

== Ideas on exercise and training effect ==
Cooper studied the effect of exercise in the late 1960s and popularized the term "training effect" although that term had been used before. The measured effects were that muscles of respiration were strengthened, the heart was strengthened, blood pressure was sometimes lowered and the total amount of blood and number of red blood cells increased, making the blood a more efficient carrier of oxygen. VO_{2} Max was increased. He published his ideas in a book, Aerobics in 1968.

The exercise necessary can be accomplished by any aerobic exercise in a wide variety of schedules - Cooper found it best to award "points" for each amount of exercise and require 30 points a week to maintain the Training Effect.

Cooper instead recommended a "12-minute test" (the Cooper test) followed by adherence to the appropriate starting-up schedule in his book. As always, he recommends that a physical exam should precede any exercise program.

The physiological effects of training have received much further study since Cooper's original work. It is now generally considered that effects of exercise on general metabolic rate (post-exercise) are comparatively small and the greatest effect occurs for only a few hours. However it is also generally considered that Aerobic exercise contributes to overall quality of life, particularly in later years. Several studies support an increase in longevity as well. Though endurance training does increase the VO_{2} max of many people, there is considerable variation in the degree to which it increases VO_{2} max between individuals.

== See also ==
- Aerobics
- Bill Orban
- Exercise
- Exercise physiology
- Physical fitness
- Power walking
