= Bill Orban =

Canadian public servant and academic

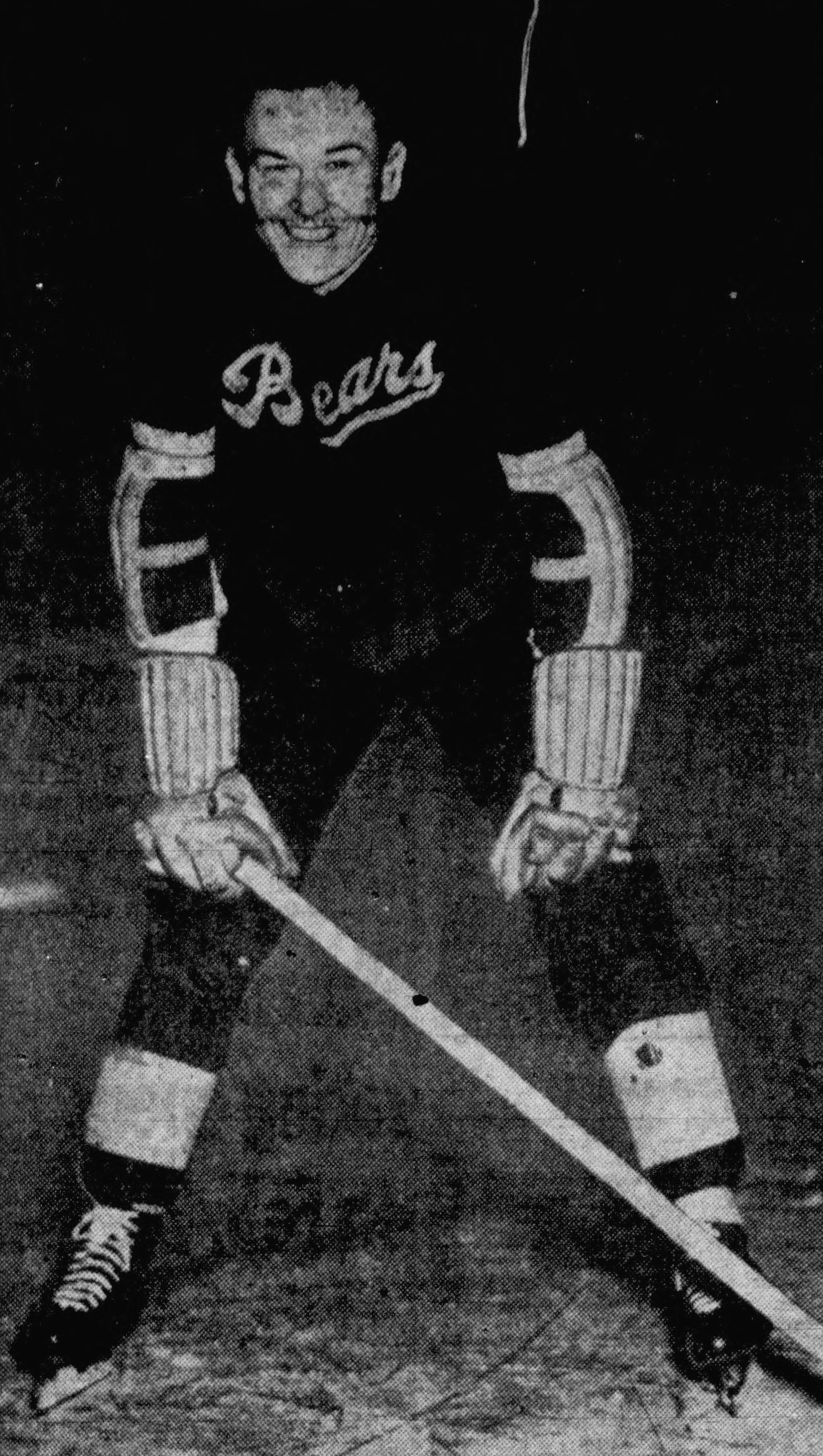
- Orban during his time with the California Golden Bears ice hockey team, circa 1942.
- Born: 21 April 1922; Regina, Saskatchewan
- Died: 18 October 2003 (aged 81); Ottawa, Ontario
- Education: University of California, Berkeley; McGill University; University of Illinois at Urbana-Champaign
- Occupation(s): Public servant, academic
- Spouse: Virginia Krasiun
- Children: 7 Children

William Robert Orban (21 April 1922 – 18 October 2003) was a Canadian public servant and academic. He was a "pioneer" in the field of physical fitness, best known for creating the 5BX and XBX programmes in the late 1950s.

== Early life ==
Orban was born on 21 April 1922 in Regina, Saskatchewan. His parents were immigrants from Hungary. Orban played many sports at the Jesuit high school he attended. In 1941 he was offered a hockey scholarship to attend the University of California, Berkeley, where he initially studied engineering. Orban attended the School of Physical Education at McGill University and graduated in 1949. In 1953, he went on to study a Ph.D. at the University of Illinois.

== Career ==
Orban accepted a job offered by Wing Commander John Tett and returned to Canada in 1956, despite offers of employment from several American universities. He took a position at the Department of National Defence and was tasked to develop a fitness programme for Royal Canadian Air Force pilots, a third of whom were not considered fit to fly.

In response to this brief he created the 5BX (5 Basic Exercises) plan for men and the XBX (10 Basic Exercise) plan for women. The plans were innovative in two respects. Firstly, they did not require access to specialised equipment. Many Air Force pilots were located in remote bases in northern Canada, with no access to these facilities, so it was important to offer a means of keeping fit without their use. Secondly, the plans only required 11 minutes (for men) or 12 minutes (for women) per day to be spent on the exercises. While studying the effect of exercise at the University of Illinois in the 1950s, Orban noticed when testing oxygen intake that long periods of exercise did not necessarily lead to significant improvement. This led him to the conclusion that the intensity of exercise was more important, than the amount of time spent on it. This aspect of the plan drew a negative reaction from others in the field but the 5BX programme proved its worth. 23 million copies of the booklets were sold, being translated into 13 languages. The popularity of the programs in many countries around the world helped to launch modern fitness culture. Orban, as a public servant, received no additional income from the success of the plan.

In 1958, the University of Saskatchewan employed Orban to take the position of dean at its new Physical Education programme. While there he initiated the Saskatchewan Growth Study - a pioneering study of physical development in boys aged 7 to 17. In 1966, Orban returned to Ottawa to become a professor of the University of Ottawa's Human Kinetics department and became dean of that department in 1968, a position he occupied until 1976. He continued as a professor in Kinanthropology until his retirement in 1987.

After his retirement, Orban developed the Physical Energetics Systems of Equations (PESE). This would allow individuals to calculate exactly how fit they could potentially be and what level of exercise would allow them to achieve this. He hoped that it would allow training times for athletes to be cut and help people recovering from illnesses to become fitter.

== Personal life and death ==
With his wife, Virginia Krasiun, Orban had five sons, Bill, Jim, John, Jerry, and Danny and two daughters, Victoria and Patricia .

Orban died of prostate cancer and melanoma at age 81 in Ottawa.

== Works ==
- Wagorn, Yvonne; Orban, Bill; Théberge, Sonia (1991). Healthy Happy Aging. Burnstown, Ontario: GSPH. ISBN 9780919431430. OCLC 23215185.

== See also ==
- Exercise
- Exercise physiology
- Kenneth H. Cooper
