= Fitness culture =

Sociocultural phenomenon surrounding exercise and physical fitness

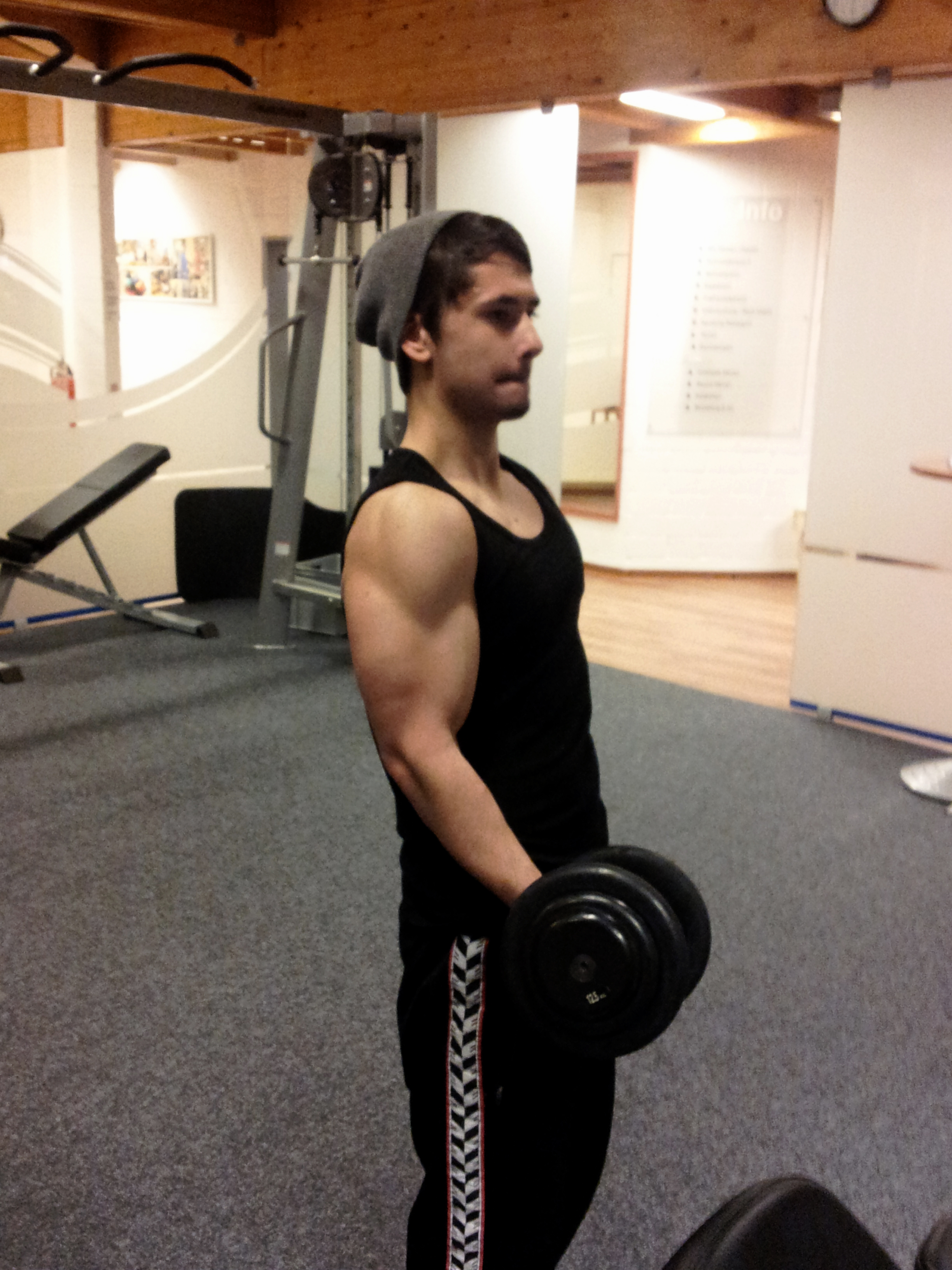
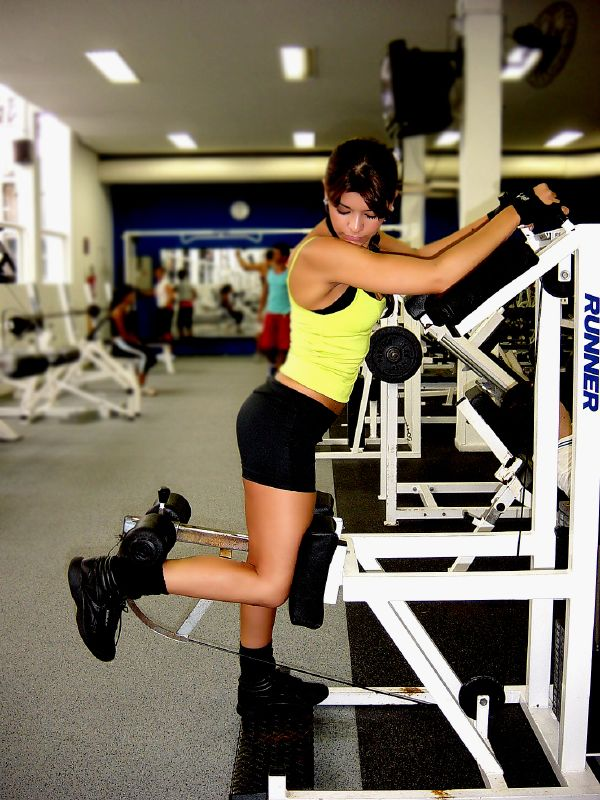
A man and a woman in a health club

Fitness culture is a sociocultural phenomenon surrounding exercise and physical fitness. It is usually associated with gym culture, as doing physical exercises in locations such as gyms, wellness centres and health clubs is a popular activity. An international survey found that more than 27% of the world's total adult population attends fitness centres, and that 61% of regular exercisers are currently doing "gym-type" activities. Getting and maintaining physical fitness has been shown to benefit individuals' inner and outer health. Fitness culture has been highly promoted through modern technology and social media platforms.

== Development ==
=== Gymnastics of ancient Greece and Rome ===
The word gymnastics is derived from the Greek word gymnazein which literally means "to exercise naked". In ancient Greece and Rome, a public place devoted to athletes training, called gymnasion (plural: gymnasia) for Greeks and palaestra (plural: palaestrae) for Romans existed in cities. Fitness was regarded as a concept shaped by two cultural codes: rationalization and asceticism; authenticity and hedonism, respectively. In Greece, gymnastic excellence was regarded as a noble and godly pursuit and was included in a complete education. Gymnasiums became the center of the community, being associated with the arts, the study of logic, and a source of entertainment. Skilled athletes attained an elevated status and devoted their lives to becoming proficient in exercise. Both men and women participated in various gymnastic exercises. The series of activities included swimming, throwing, wrestling, jumping and weightlifting. After the Romans conquered Greece, they developed the activities into a more formal sport and used their gymnasiums to prepare their legions for warfare. However, with the decline of the Roman Empire, interest in gymnastics declined, and it is now only known as a form of entertainment.

=== Nineteenth century ===
From around 1800, gymnastics developed in Western countries that was meant to enhance the body in order to sustain public morals and mold better citizens. Pehr Henrik Ling was a pioneer in the teaching of physical education in Sweden, and he sought to reform and improve the gymnastics of the ancient Greeks. In 1850, the Supreme Medical Board of Russia reported to their emperor on Ling's system, that by improving one's overall fitness, an athlete became superior to those who merely focused on a subset of muscles or actions. In the mid-19th century, the world saw the rise of physical culture, a movement that emphasized the importance of physical exercise for men, women, and children alike. Diocletian Lewis, a physician, even advocated for males and females exercising together in the gym. In 1896, men's gymnastics was on the schedule of the first modern Olympics. The Olympic gymnastic competition for women began in 1928.

=== World War II ===
Leading up to and during World War II, totalitarian regimes used gymnastics as a way to promote their ideologies. Physical fitness was at the core of Nazi philosophy, and the German government financed the construction of sports and wellness facilities. In 1922, the Nazi Party established the Hitler Youth, where children and adolescents participated in physical activities to develop both their physical and mental fitness. Nazi sports imagery served the purpose of promoting the idea of "Aryan" racial superiority, and in 1933, an "Aryans only" policy was instituted in all German athletic organizations.

In the Soviet Union, the Leninist Young Communist League created the Ready for Labour and Defence of the USSR in 1931, which was a fitness program that was designed to improve public health and prepare the population for highly productive work and the defense of "the motherland".

=== The Cold War ===
During the Cold War, a focus on physical fitness emerged in both the United States and the Soviet Union. Senator Hubert Humphrey gravely warned that communist dominance came from superior sports and fitness programs. His remarks reflected the growing American paranoia of communism. In response, leaders of the military, civilian government, and private sector began crafting a "cult and ritual of toughness". President John F. Kennedy issued a call to the nation urging Americans to prioritize their physical fitness across the country. Fitness was clearly described as a "matter of achieving an optimum state of well-being" that required exercise from both young and old. This focus on fitness also enabled female athletes in both the U.S. and the USSR to become more prominent as contenders in the Olympics.

In China, Mao Zedong emphasized fitness under his leadership, both in the provisional Chinese Soviet Republic and later the People's Republic of China, under which state-owned entities such as government organizations, factories, and schools were tasked with organizing physical activities and sports leagues. Fitness and health were ways in which Mao differentiated "new China" from "old China." During the Cultural Revolution, concepts of socialist class struggle were applied to sporting, and elite sports leagues were disbanded, with high-level athletes and coaches subject to re-education. Policies and propaganda efforts emphasized forms of physical fitness which promoted public health such as swimming, gymnastics, and tai chi.

=== Mass participation, commercialization ===
After World War II, a new form of non-organized, individualistic, health-oriented physical and recreational activities such as jogging began to prevail. The Royal Canadian Air Force Exercise Plans, developed by Dr Bill Orban in 1961, sold 23 million copies to the public. United States Air Force Colonel Kenneth Cooper's book Aerobics was released in 1968 and the mass-market version The New Aerobics in 1979. These publications by Orban and Cooper helped to launch modern fitness culture. The Olympics inspired a running boom in the 1970s. After the release of Jane Fonda's Workout exercise videos in 1982, aerobics became a popular form of group gymnastic activity.

Fitness began to be commercialised. Gyms were set up with the goals not to improve public health but to stimulate and exploit the desire of people to keep fit, have fun and improve themselves. It can also be observed in today's gyms where bodybuilders are trying to reach their aesthetic ideas, through muscle development, using weights and other equipment. Growth in bodybuilding as a fitness phenomenon followed the movie and book Pumping Iron in 1977 and the movie Pumping Iron II in 1985.

The term gym is often associated with the term fitness, and going to gyms means doing exercises in fitness institutions such as fitness centres, health clubs or gym clubs where people have to pay for membership in order to use fitness equipment and participate in group fitness activities with instructors, such as aerobics and yoga classes.

=== Technology, specialization, branding ===
Advances in technology in the twenty-first century have changed the way of doing fitness activities. The Quantified Self has become a new phenomenon, where people use the help of technological devices to support their workouts. It is characterized by the use of gadgets such as pedometer, GPS, heart rate monitor and smartphone apps to quantify or monitor the exerciser's efforts.

There was a decrease in popularity of "pure aerobics" exercise and an increase in "socially based exercise". Participation moved from aerobics, bodybuilding, and traditional technique of exercises to activities such as yoga, zumba, pilates, spinning and aquacycling, tai chi, kickboxing, and outdoor fitness.

Research has also examined whether activity-tracking technology can help people increase their physical activity. A systematic review and meta-analysis of randomized controlled trials found that interventions using smartphone applications or activity trackers to monitor activity and provide feedback were associated with increased physical activity among adults. These findings suggest that digital tracking tools can play a role in exercise participation, although the effects may vary depending on the intervention.

== Influences ==
=== Mass media ===
Mass media shapes fitness culture by conveying an ideal body image, often promoting slimness or even thinness for females and slenderness or muscularity for males. Commercial advertisements have also created an influential and powerful force in promoting a stereotype of ideal body image which is not limited to fashion advertisements.

Exercising and dieting are often seen as the best way to achieve such an ideal body image. Fashion magazines promote slimness and thinness as the ideal female image. High-fashion models are usually slim and thin. In addition, the shape of models has changed dramatically towards a "more tubular female form" in high fashion culture, often sparking controversies.

Fitness-related content on social media, such as Facebook or Instagram, can be called fitspiration. When women view fitness content, they tend to develop a more negative body image and are quicker to compare their bodies to the ones they are seeing on social media.

Research has also examined the credibility of fitness content shared on social media. A 2023 study that evaluated 100 popular Instagram accounts using the hashtag “fitspiration” found that only 41% met the researchers' criteria for credible content. The study identified concerns including sexualized imagery, the promotion of extreme body types, and accounts with little fitness-related content. These findings suggest that fitness content on social media can vary in quality and may not always provide reliable health or exercise information.

=== Peer influence ===
People who regularly attend fitness institutions tend to make friends at these locations. They want to feel part of a group, which can be referred to as community feeling, as the behavior of group membership is transmitted from member to member within a group. However, this kind of friendship usually remains restricted within the fitness institution. Besides, the atmosphere in fitness institutions created by people with the same goal becomes a force of motivation. When people go to fitness institutions or start a new activity, they can be encouraged by others and give support to each other.

In addition, fitness institutions can function as dating agencies, creating chances to meet people apart from workplaces. Music, body movement, and costumes of people exercising can easily draw attention and become an occasion to engage with each other.

Another important aspect of fitness culture is the gender differentiation in exercises performed. One study showed that women prefer to do cardiovascular exercise over weight training because it allows them to gain strength without transgressing norms for feminine physical appearance, whereas men prefer other exercises like bodybuilding or boxing in order to be more muscular.

Online networks can also influence participation in physical activity. In a randomized controlled trial involving 790 university students, researchers compared online exercise networks that used social support, social comparison, or a combination of both. Participants in the groups that included social comparison attended more exercise classes than those in groups without social comparison. The findings suggest that comparing activity with peers can influence exercise participation in structured programs.

=== Personal trainers ===
Fitness institutions have been developed as a commercial environment since the 1980s. Personal trainers act as intermediaries between customers and the fitness institution, playing a crucial role in the commercialization of fitness culture.

The popularity of personal trainers can be explained by the human tendency toward rule-governed behavior. The role of personal trainers has also revealed a phenomenon which can be explained from the sociological perspective of "outsourced-self". This means "transferring our own responsibility to other". Keeping healthy and well are people's own responsibility; however, people are hiring personal trainers to be responsible for it. It is also relevant to the perspective of "body work" in the sociology of body: people are outsourcing their own bodies to paid workers in order to keep healthy and prevent illness.

=== Fitness fashion ===
Fitness fashion is a product created by the commercialization of fitness culture. As mentioned above, personal trainers also act as agents to sell different goods and services. An example is the case of Body Training System (BTS). BTS instructors are suggested to change their costumes according to the programs in order to show the differences in character. The aim is to inspire the trainees to purchase the same costumes offered by the programs.

Fitness fashion and athletic footwear have become the fastest-growing segments in the apparel market. The athleisure trend frames it not only for sports activities but also as daywear or weekend wear. While classic sports brands continue to expand their market share in the industry, high fashion brands have also joined the competition.

== See also ==
- 20th century women's fitness culture
- Aerobic exercise § History
- Exercise § History
- Exercise trends
- Health club
- History of physical training and fitness
- List of exercise activities
- Physical fitness
- Social influences on fitness behavior
- Sociology of sport
- Sociology of the body
