= Physical Activity Guidelines for Americans =

American government health advice

Physical Activity Guidelines for Americans are National Physical Activity Guidelines first published by the United States Department of Health and Human Services (HHS) in 2008. These guidelines provided physical activity recommendations for people aged six years and older, including those with many chronic health conditions and disabilities. The science-based Guidelines recommend a total amount of physical activity per week to achieve a range of health benefits. In 2018, HHS released an update to the first set of guidelines. This 2018 edition provides guidelines for people aged three years and older and summarizes the new knowledge gained from studies that were conducted since the first edition was released in 2008.

These Guidelines can be tailored to meet individual interests, lifestyles, and goals. Recommendations in the Guidelines can be incorporated within daily routines and allow activities—like walking, biking, or dancing—to be integrated.

The main message is that regular physical activity over months and years can produce long-term health benefits and reduce the risk of many diseases. The second edition includes new evidence that shows physical activity also has many immediate health benefits such as reduced anxiety and blood pressure. The messages from the Physical Activity Guidelines are also found in the Dietary Guidelines for Americans which provide recommendations for healthy food choices and regular physical activity.

Health professionals and policymakers are the primary audiences for the Physical Activity Guidelines for Americans. However, the information is useful for anyone interested in improving the health of their community members and other individuals. HHS also produced a consumer friendly communications campaign, Move Your Way, which provides tools and resources for the public to help them meet the Guidelines.

== History ==
The Physical Activity Guidelines for Americans are based on a comprehensive review of scientific research about physical activity and health.

HHS released an update to its Physical Activity Guidelines for Americans in 2018, a decade after publishing its first set of guidelines. The 2018 report linked the lack of physical activity to about $117 billion in annual healthcare costs and about 10% of premature mortality.

While the 2008 edition gave recommendations for children from age 6 years onward, the 2018 edition includes guidelines for children aged 3 years and older.

== Health benefits of regular physical activity ==
- Health benefits of regular physical activity occur for children and adolescents, young and middle-aged adults, women who are pregnant or postpartum, older adults, and those in every studied racial and ethnic group. There are also benefits for people who have disabilities.
- Both aerobic (endurance) and muscle-strengthening (resistance) physical activities are beneficial. Bone-strengthening activities are also important for children and adolescents.
- The benefits of physical activity far outweigh the possibility of adverse outcomes.
- Regular physical activity is one of the most important things you can do for your health. It can help:
1. Control your weight
2. Reduce your risk of cardiovascular disease
3. Reduce your risk for type 2 diabetes and metabolic syndrome
4. Reduce your risk of some cancers
5. Strengthen your bones and muscles
6. Improve your mental health and mood
7. Improve your brain health, including possible improved cognitive function and improved sleep
8. Improve your ability to do daily activities, prevent falls, and risk of fall-related injuries if you're an older adult
9. Increase your chances of living longer

== Key guidelines ==
=== Preschool-aged children ===
- Preschool-aged children (ages 3 through 5 years) should be physically active throughout the day to enhance growth and development.
- Adult caregivers of preschool-aged children should encourage active play that includes a variety of activity types.

=== Children and adolescents ===
- It is important to provide young people opportunities and encouragement to participate in physical activities that are appropriate for their age, that are enjoyable, and that offer variety.
- Children and adolescents (6-17) should do at least 60 minutes (1 hour) or more of moderate-to-vigorous physical activity daily.

Aerobic: Most of the 60 minutes or more per day should be either moderate- or vigorous-intensity aerobic physical activity and should include vigorous intensity physical activity on at least 3 days a week.

Muscle-strengthening: As part of their 60 minutes or more of daily physical activity, children and adolescents should include muscle-strengthening physical activity on at least 3 days a week.

Bone-strengthening: As part of their 60 minutes or more of daily physical activity, children and adolescents should include bone-strengthening physical activity on at least 3 days a week.

Moderate activities are those such as riding a bike, brisk walking, and games that require catching and throwing. Vigorous activities are those such as running; sports such as soccer, ice or field hockey, basketball, swimming, or tennis; and active games requiring running and chasing, such as tag or flag football. Muscle- strengthening activities are games such as tug-of-war; resistance exercises using bands, body weight, or hand held weights; climbing a rope, tree, or wall;, and doing sit-ups. Bone -strengthening activities are games that involved hopping, skipping or jumping, and running.

=== Adults ===
- Adults should move more and sit less throughout the day. Some physical activity is better than none. Adults who sit less and do any amount of moderate-to-vigorous physical activity gain some health benefits.
- For substantial health benefits, adults should do at least 150 minutes (2 hours and 30 minutes) to 300 minutes (5 hours) a week of moderate-intensity, or 75 minutes (1 hour and 15 minutes) to 150 minutes (2 hours and 30 minutes) a week of vigorous-intensity aerobic physical activity, or an equivalent combination of moderate- and vigorous-intensity aerobic activity. Preferably, aerobic activity should be spread throughout the week.
- Additional health benefits are gained by engaging in physical activity beyond the equivalent of 300 minutes (5 hours) of moderate-intensity physical activity a week.
- Adults should also do muscle-strengthening activities of moderate or greater intensity and that involve all major muscle groups on 2 or more days a week, as these activities provide additional health benefits.

Moderate activities are those such as ballroom and line dancing, biking on level ground or with a few hills, general gardening, walking briskly, and water aerobics. Vigorous activities take more effort than moderate activities. Vigorous activities are those such as aerobic dance, biking faster than 10 miles per hour, heavy gardening, race walking, jogging, or running, and swimming fast or swimming laps. Muscle-strengthening activities should include all of the major muscle groups, such as legs, hips, back, chest, stomach, shoulders, and arms.

The 2008 Guidelines indicated it was only beneficial to do at least 10 minutes of an activity at a time. The second edition removes this requirement that states that all moderate-to-vigorous physical activity counts.

=== Older adults ===
The key guidelines for adults also apply to older adults. In addition, the following key guidelines are just for older adults:

- As part of their weekly physical activity, older adults should do multicomponent physical activity that includes balance training as well as aerobic and muscle strengthening activities.
- Older adults should determine their level of effort for physical activity relative to their level of fitness.
- Older adults with chronic conditions should understand whether and how their conditions affect their ability to do regular physical activity safely.
- When older adults cannot do 150 minutes of moderate-intensity aerobic activity a week because of chronic conditions, they should be as physically active as their abilities and conditions allow.

=== Pregnant and postpartum women ===
- Women should do at least 150 minutes (2 hours and 30 minutes) of moderate intensity aerobic activity a week during pregnancy and the postpartum period. Preferably, aerobic activity should be spread throughout the week.
- Women who habitually engaged in vigorous-intensity aerobic activity or who were physically active before pregnancy can continue these activities during pregnancy and the postpartum period.
- Women who are pregnant should be under the care of a health care provider who can monitor the progress of the pregnancy. Women who are pregnant can consult their health care provider about whether or how to adjust their physical activity during pregnancy and after the baby is born.

=== Adults with chronic health conditions or disabilities ===
- Adults with chronic conditions or disabilities, who are able, should do at least 150 minutes (2 hours and 30 minutes) to 300 minutes (5 hours) a week of moderate-intensity, or 75 minutes (1 hour and 15 minutes) to 150 minutes (2 hours and 30 minutes) a week of vigorous-intensity aerobic physical activity, or an equivalent combination of moderate- and vigorous-intensity aerobic activity. Preferably, aerobic activity should be spread throughout the week.
- Adults with chronic conditions or disabilities, who are able, should also do muscle-strengthening activities of moderate or greater intensity and that involve all major muscle groups on 2 or more days a week, as these activities provide additional health benefits.
- When adults with chronic conditions or disabilities are not able to meet the above key guidelines, they should engage in regular physical activity according to their abilities and should avoid inactivity.
- Adults with chronic conditions or symptoms should be under the care of a health care provider. People with chronic conditions can consult a health care professional or physical activity specialist about the types and amounts of activity appropriate for their abilities and chronic conditions.

=== Safe physical activity ===
To do physical activity safely and reduce risk of injuries and other adverse events, people should:

- Understand the risks, yet be confident that physical activity can be safe for almost everyone.
- Choose types of physical activity that are appropriate for their current fitness level and health goals, because some activities are safer than others.
- Increase physical activity gradually over time to meet key guidelines or health goals. Inactive people should “start low and go slow” by starting with lower intensity activities and gradually increasing how often and how long activities are done.
- Protect themselves by using appropriate gear and sports equipment, choosing safe environments, following rules and policies, and making sensible choices about when, where, and how to be active.
- Be under the care of a health care provider if they have chronic conditions or symptoms. People with chronic conditions and symptoms can consult a health care professional or physical activity specialist about the types and amounts of activity appropriate for them.

== Other federal guidance related to youth physical activity ==
=== Fundamental movement skills ===
Related to the U.S. Department of Health and Human Service's Physical Activity Guidelines for Americans are Fundamental Movement Skills. As defined by the Department of Education:

“fundamental movement skills are movement patterns that involve different body parts such as the legs, arms, trunk and head, and include such skills as running, hopping, catching, throwing, striking, and balancing. They are the foundation movements or precursor patterns to the more specialized, complex skills used in play, games, sports, dance, gymnastics, outdoor education and physical recreation activities”

Fundamental movement skills are broken up into three categories, including body management skills, loco motor skills, and object control skills.

- Body management skills are those that involve balancing the body in motion and stillness, and are accomplished through moves such as climbing, rolling, twisting, turning and stopping.
- Loco motor skills refer to movements that transport the body from one place to another. These include galloping, crawling, running, hopping and skipping.
- Object control skills involve controlling objects with the hands or feet. Such moves would include throwing, bouncing, dribbling, and catching.

=== Impact on development ===
These skill sets are dubbed fundamental because they are crucial to many aspects of development. Physical development is a more obvious positive outcome from learning these skills, but perhaps less considered outcomes are social and mental development.

- Social Development: Children who are capable of performing these moves find it easier to participate in games and are more likely to do so. They have greater confidence in themselves, higher self-esteem, and are more likely to be viewed as popular playmates.
- Mental Development: Many children can demonstrate learning through movement better than they could through the more traditional means of writing or drawing. Physical activity, in general, has been shown to increase academic performance by bettering concentration and attentiveness, as well as improving attitudes towards school.
- Physical Development: Children who foster these movements are more likely to adopt healthful habits, such as regular physical activity, and improve muscle and bone development. The benefits of physical activity seem endless; however, they are unrecognized by many.
