= Royal Canadian Air Force Exercise Plans =

1950s physical exercise plans (5BX)

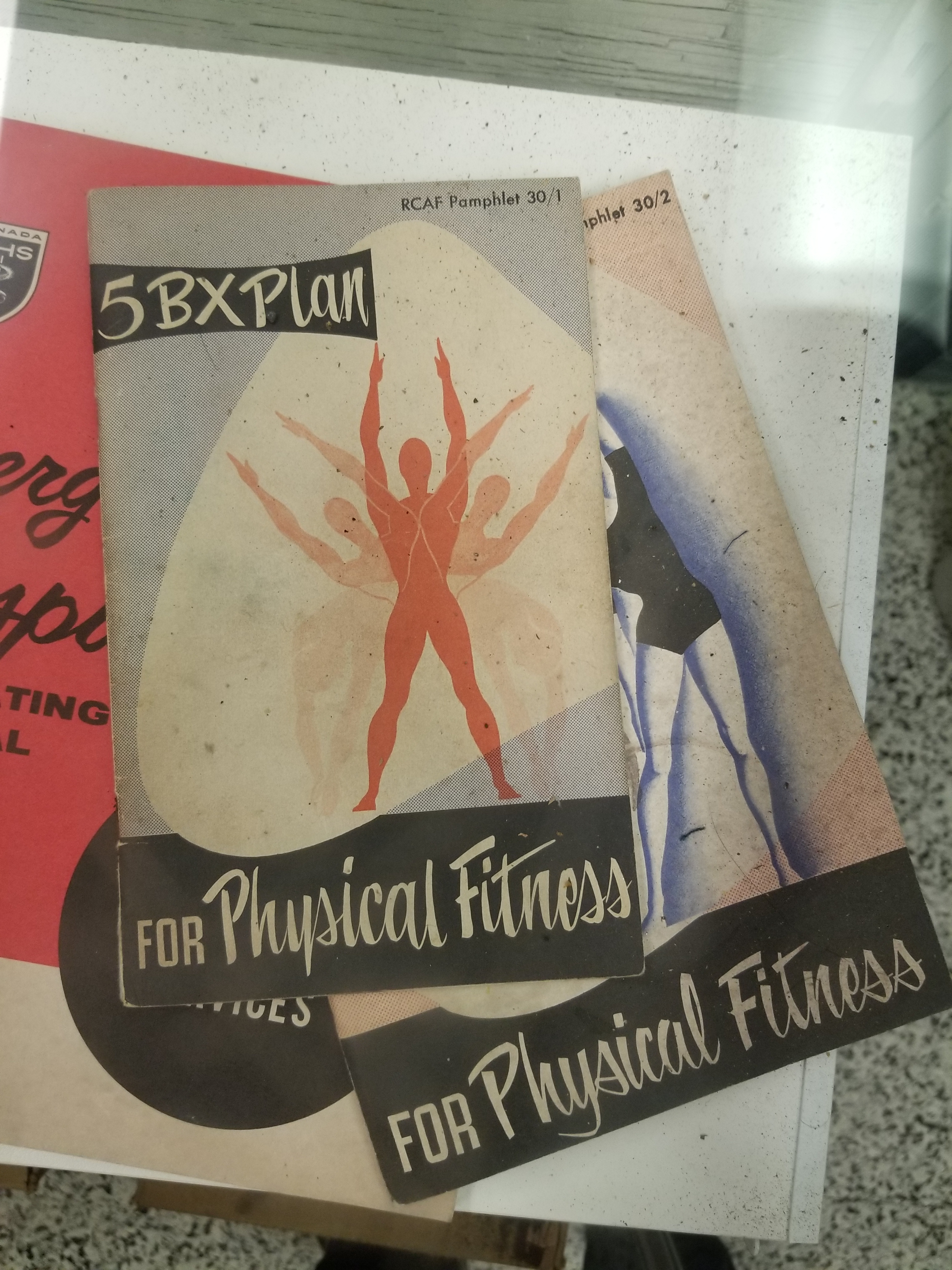
5BX and XBX booklets on display at the infirmary in the Diefenbunker museum, June 2018.

The Royal Canadian Air Force Exercise Plans are two exercise plans developed for the Royal Canadian Air Force (RCAF) by Dr. Bill Orban in the late 1950s, first published in 1961. The 5BX plan (Five Basic Exercises) was developed for men; a corresponding program was developed for women under the name XBX (Ten Basic Exercises) and the two plans were subsequently published together as one book, which was republished in 2016. The popularity of the programs in many countries around the world helped to launch modern fitness culture.

== History ==
Wing Commander John Tett was appointed Special Education Officer in the RCAF in 1952. His mandate was to establish a directorate and trade for the development of physical fitness, sports and recreation. In 1956 he hired Bill Orban and directed him to devise a program which emphasized the development of a high level of fitness, but would consume only a relatively small amount of the RCAF personnel's time. The program was intended for RCAF pilots, a third of whom were not considered fit to fly at the time.

While performing research at the University of Illinois in the early 1950s, Orban had noticed, when testing oxygen intake, that long periods of exercise did not necessarily lead to significant improvement. This led him to the conclusion that the intensity of exercise was more important to improving fitness than the amount of time spent on it. He incorporated this conclusion into his proposed exercise plan for the RCAF. This concept drew a negative reaction from others in the field at the time but it proved its worth in the three years of testing that the RCAF performed before releasing the program in 1961.

Based on this research and testing, Orban came up with five basic exercises (5BX), four to improve flexibility and strength and one to boost aerobic fitness. The plan was innovative in two respects. Firstly, it did not require access to specialized equipment. Many RCAF pilots were located in remote bases in northern Canada, with no access to gymnasium facilities, so it was important to offer a means of keeping fit without their use. Secondly, the plan only required that eleven minutes be spent on the exercises per day. After further research and testing involving over 600 volunteers, he produced a program with ten basic exercises (XBX) for women that required twelve minutes to complete.

The programs proved popular with civilians. A U.S. edition was published in 1962 under the title Royal Canadian Air Force Exercise Plans For Physical Fitness. The publication became popular around the world and was translated into thirteen languages. In total, twenty-three million copies of the booklets were sold to the public. Orban, creating the program as a public servant, received no additional income from the success of the plan. In English, it was republished throughout the 1960s, 70s, 80s and in 1992.

John Walker's book The Hacker's Diet (first published in 1991) contains a simplified version, that is claimed to be suitable for everyone. The original 5BX programme has also been updated by three Australian fitness trainers under the title Goodbye Couch! Len Deighton's novel Only When I Larf contains a reference to the 5BX program.

Celebrity practitioners of the program included the late George Burns. Past practitioners include Helen Mirren and the British princes Philip, Charles, William and his wife Catherine.

== 5BX Plan ==
The 5BX Plan For Physical Fitness is composed of six charts arranged in increasing order of difficulty. Each chart is composed of five exercises that are performed within eleven minutes. The first four exercises are calisthenics and the last is an aerobic exercise. As the individual progresses within the system, the number of each type of exercise that must be performed increases and the difficulty of each exercise increases.

=== Exercises ===
Throughout the charts and levels, the five exercises are the same, but more difficult variations are introduced:

1. Stretching
2. Sit-up
3. Back extension
4. Push-up
5. Running in place

A walk or run may be substituted for the final exercise; the distances to be covered and the time to be taken are also specified in the plan.

== XBX Plan ==
The XBX Plan For Physical Fitness was developed for women. The program consists of charts that get progressively more difficult, and takes 12 minutes per day after users get past the beginning levels.

=== Exercises ===
The first four exercises are primarily for flexibility; exercises 5-9 are primarily to improve muscle strength; and exercise 10 is to develop aerobic capacity:

1. Toe touching
2. Knee raising
3. Lateral bending
4. Arm circling
5. Sit-ups
6. Chest and leg raising
7. Side leg raising
8. Push-ups
9. Leg lifting
10. Running and jumping in place

Two optional supplementary exercises are also described.

== See also ==
- Fitness boot camp
