= Physical fitness =

State of health and well-being

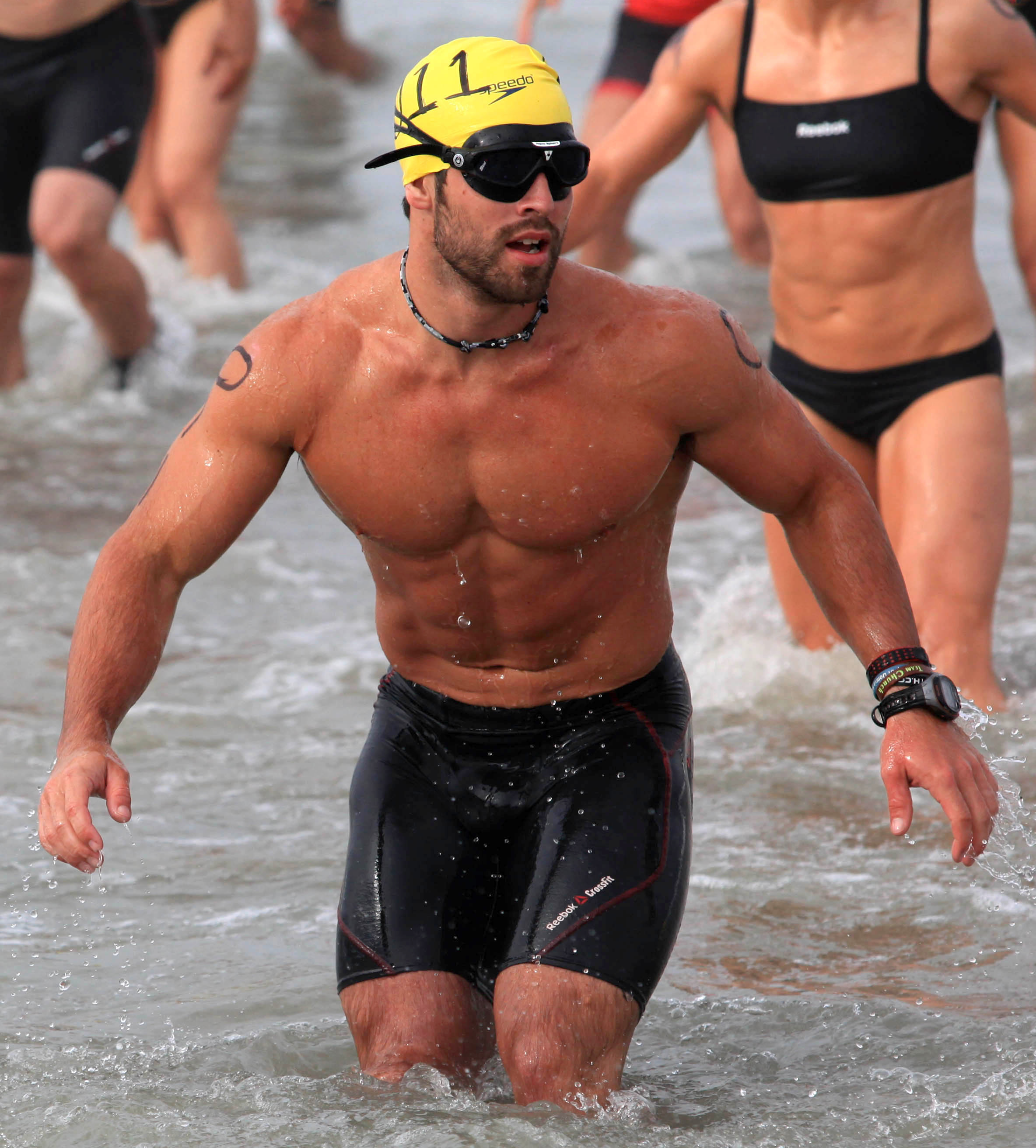
Physical fitness is achieved through exercise, among other factors. Photo shows Rich Froning Jr., four-time winner of "Fittest Man on Earth" title.

Physical fitness is a state of health and well-being and, more specifically, the ability to perform aspects of sports, occupations, and daily activities. Physical fitness is generally achieved through proper nutrition, moderate-vigorous physical exercise, and sufficient rest along with a formal recovery plan.

Before the Industrial Revolution, fitness was defined as the capacity to carry out the day's activities without undue fatigue or lethargy. However, with automation and changes in lifestyles, physical fitness is now considered a measure of the body's ability to function efficiently and effectively in work and leisure activities, to be healthy, to resist hypokinetic diseases, to improve immune system function, and to meet emergency situations.

== Overview ==
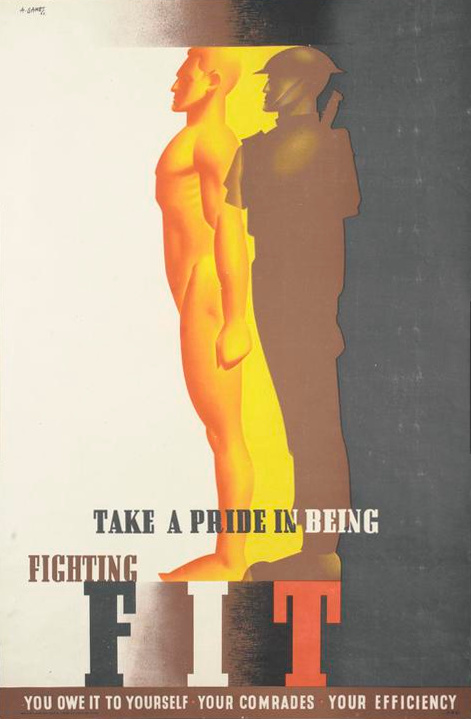
British World War II army fitness poster

Fitness is defined as the quality or state of being fit and healthy. Around 1950, perhaps consistent with the Industrial Revolution and the treatise of World War II, the term "fitness" increased in western vernacular by a factor of ten. The modern definition of fitness describes either a person or machine's ability to perform a specific function or a holistic definition of human adaptability to cope with various situations. This has led to an interrelation of human fitness and physical attractiveness that has mobilized global fitness and fitness equipment industries. Regarding specific function, fitness is attributed to persons who possess significant aerobic or anaerobic ability (i.e., endurance or strength). A well-rounded fitness program improves a person in all aspects of fitness compared to practicing only one, such as only cardio/respiratory or only weight training.

A comprehensive fitness program tailored to an individual typically focuses on one or more specific skills, and on age- or health-related needs such as bone health. Many sources also cite mental, social and emotional health as an important part of overall fitness. This is often presented in textbooks as a triangle made up of three points, which represent physical, emotional, and mental fitness. Physical fitness has been shown to have benefits in preventing ill health and assisting recovery from injury or illness. Along with the physical health benefits of fitness, it has also been shown to have a positive impact on mental health as well by assisting in treating anxiety and depression. Physical fitness can also prevent or treat many other chronic health conditions brought on by unhealthy lifestyle or aging as well and has been listed frequently as one of the most popular and advantageous self-care therapies. Working out can also help some people sleep better by building up sleeping pressure and possibly alleviate some mood disorders in certain individuals.

Developing research has demonstrated that many of exercise's benefits are mediated through the role of skeletal muscle as an endocrine organ. That is, contracting muscles release multiple substances known as myokines, which promote the growth of new tissue, tissue repair, and various anti-inflammatory functions, which in turn reduce the risk of developing various inflammatory diseases.

== Activity guidelines ==
The 2018 Physical Activity Guidelines for Americans were released by the U.S. Department of Health and Human Services to provide science-based guidance for people ages 3 years and older to improve their health by participating in regular physical activity. These guidelines recommend that all adults should move more and sit less throughout the day to improve health-related quality of life including mental, emotional, and physical health. For substantial health benefits, adults should perform at least 150 to 300 minutes of moderate-intensity, or 75 to 150 minutes per week of vigorous-intensity aerobic physical activity, or an equivalent combination of both spread throughout the week. The recommendation for physical activity to occur in bouts of at least 10 minutes has been eliminated, as new research suggests that bouts of any length contribute to the health benefits linked to the accumulated volume of physical activity. Additional health benefits may be achieved by engaging in more than 300 minutes (5 hours) of moderate-intensity physical activity per week. Adults should also do muscle-strengthening activities that are of moderate or greater intensity and involve all major muscle groups on two or more days a week, as these activities provide additional health benefits.

Guidelines in the United Kingdom released in July 2011 include the following points: The intensity at which a person exercises is key, and light activity such as strolling and house work is unlikely to have much positive impact on the health of most people. For aerobic exercise to be beneficial, it must raise the heart rate and cause perspiration. A person should do a minimum of 150 minutes a week of moderate-intensity aerobic exercise. There are more health benefits gained if a person exercises beyond 150 minutes. Sedentary time (time spent not standing, such as when on a chair or in bed) is bad for a person's health, and no amount of exercise can negate the effects of sitting for too long. These guidelines are now much more in line with those used in the U.S., which also includes recommendations for muscle-building and bone-strengthening activities such as lifting weights and yoga.

== Exercise ==
=== Aerobic exercise ===
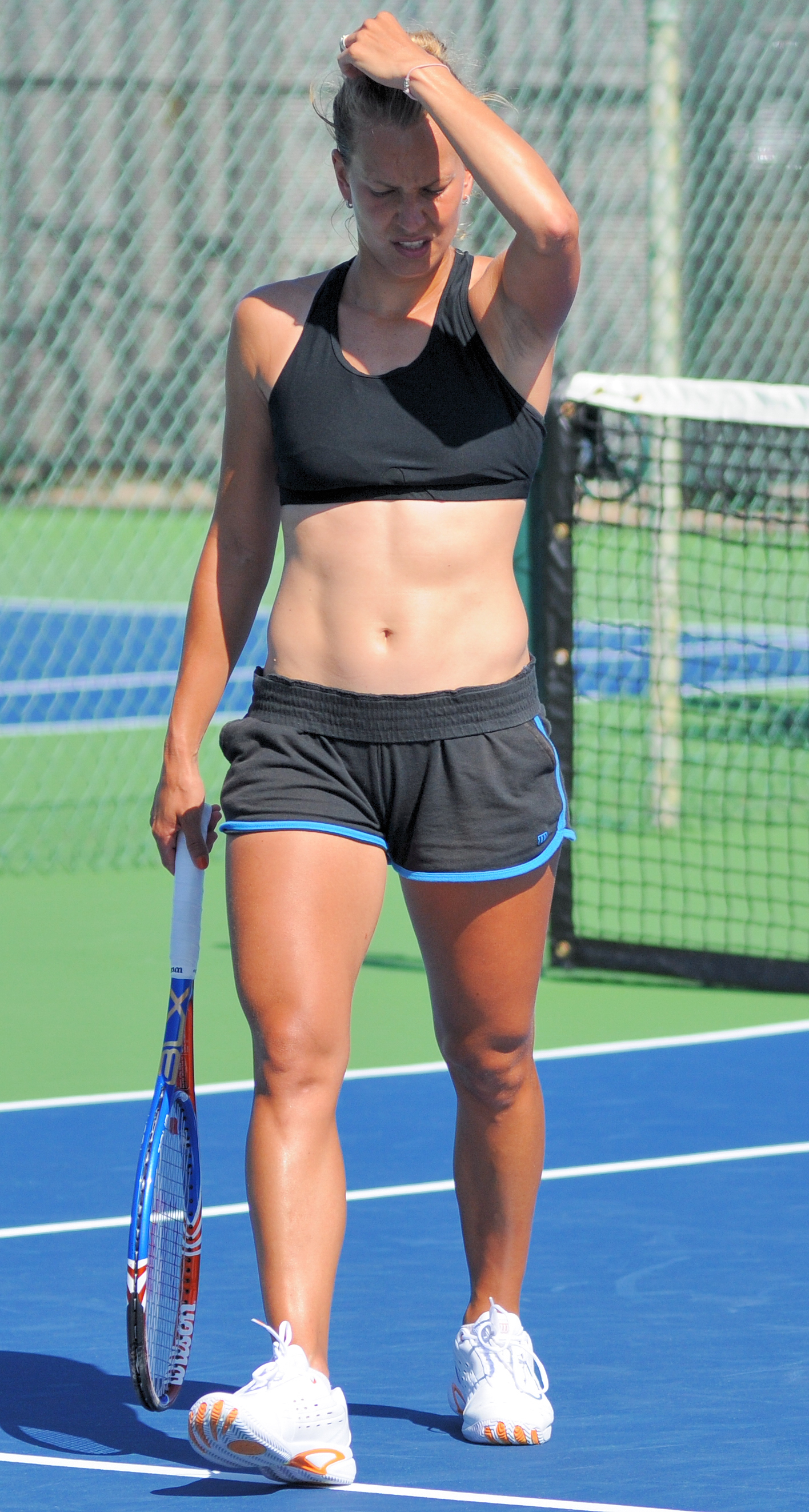
Playing sports such as lawn tennis is a common way to maintain/improve physical fitness. Image shows international tennis player Barbora Strýcová.

Cardiorespiratory fitness can be measured using VO_{2} max, a measure of the amount of oxygen the body can uptake and utilize. Aerobic exercise, which improves cardiorespiratory fitness and increase stamina, involves movement that increases the heart rate to improve the body's oxygen consumption. This form of exercise is an important part of all training regiments, whether for professional athletes or for the everyday person.

Prominent examples of aerobic exercises include:

- Jogging – Running at a steady and gentle pace. This form of exercise is great for maintaining weight and building a cardiovascular base to later perform more intense exercises.
- Working on elliptical trainer – This is a stationary exercise machine used to perform walking, or running without causing excessive stress on the joints. This form of exercise is perfect for people with achy hips, knees, and ankles.
- Walking – Moving at a fairly regular pace for a short, medium or long distance.
- Treadmill training – Many treadmills have programs set up that offer numerous different workout plans. One effective cardiovascular activity would be to switch between running and walking. Typically warm up first by walking and then switch off between walking for three minutes and running for three minutes.
- Swimming – Using the arms and legs to keep oneself afloat in water and moving either forwards or backward. This is a good full-body exercise for those who are looking to strengthen their core while improving cardiovascular endurance.
- Cycling – Riding a bicycle typically involves longer distances than walking or jogging. This is another low-impact exercise on the joints and is great for improving leg strength.

=== Anaerobic exercise ===
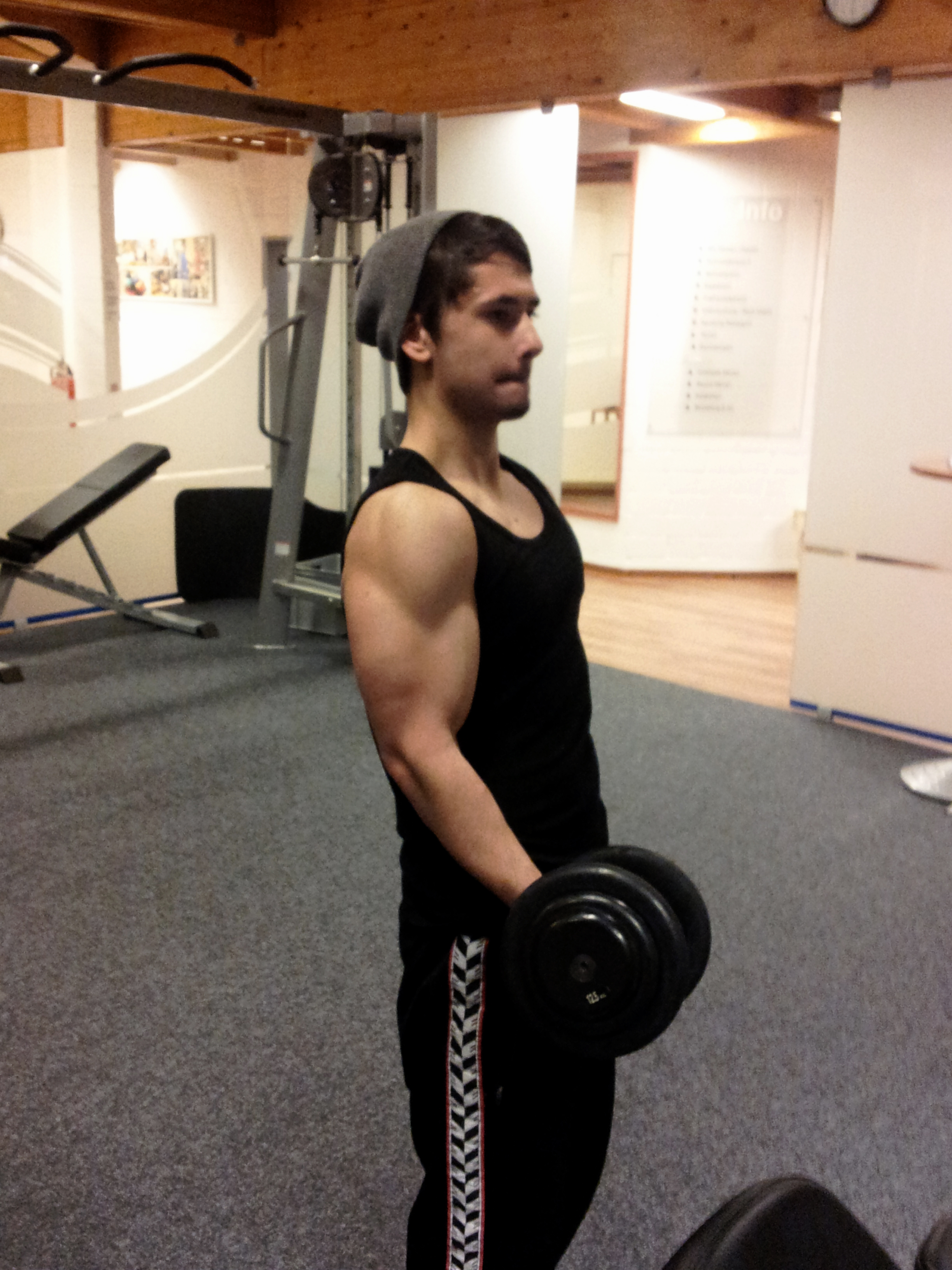
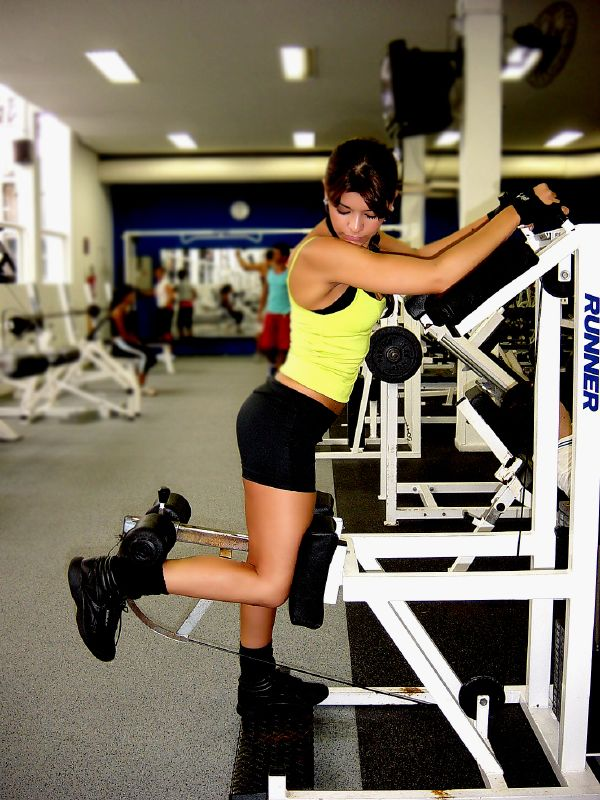
A man and a woman doing weight training at a health club

Anaerobic exercise features high-intensity movements performed in a short period of time. It is a fast, high-intensity exercise that does not require the body to utilize oxygen to produce energy. It helps to promote strength, endurance, speed, and power; and is used by bodybuilders to build workout intensity. Anaerobic exercises are thought to increase the metabolic rate, thereby allowing one to burn additional calories as the body recovers from exercise due to an increase in body temperature and excess post-exercise oxygen consumption (EPOC) after the exercise ended.

Prominent examples of anaerobic exercises include:

- Weight training – A common type of strength training for developing the strength and size of skeletal muscles.
- Isometric exercise – Helps to maintain strength. A muscle action in which no visible movement occurs and the resistance matches the muscular tension.
- Sprinting – Running short distances as fast as possible, training for muscle explosiveness.
- Interval training – Alternating short bursts (lasting around 30 seconds) of intense activity with longer intervals (three to four minutes) of less intense activity. This type of activity also builds speed and endurance.

== Recovery ==
One of the most fundamentally important elements of physical fitness is the ability to recover. It can be immediate, short term or long term, and be more active or more passive.

Immediate active recovery involves attempting to regain energy, recover breathing and restore a general sense of balance after performing a physical act of exertion. For example, a runner immediately tries to recover after completing a step and a boxer after throwing a punch. Such recovery phases may be very quick but are essential in allowing the continuation of the activity as they prevent tiredness and an excessive loss of equilibrium. The measurement of successful recovery can be based upon the person's own personal sense of recovery and how they are feeling. The ability to recover in this manner during performance is considered to be one of the hallmarks of physical fitness.

Interval training also uses immediate active recovery but on a longer timescale. In interval training a more intense exercise is alternated with a less intense one or a rest break. In the former example, the reduced energy expenditure and increased energy recovery in the less intense exercise, means that the ratio between the two is more even and the person recovers more so than if they had just performed the high intensity exercise by itself. This allows them to go on and, over the course of a session, perform the high intensity exercise more than they would have been able to do otherwise.

Short term active recovery is whereby training sessions are interspersed with lighter activities which are conducted in a more relaxed way. For example, a runner may train on Monday, enjoy a leisurely bike ride on Wednesday, and then train again on Friday. This is also known as the hard/easy rule and when followed can help to prevent over training by reducing strain while also allowing the benefits of the light exercise such as clearing excess lactate acid from the body.

Long term recovery is when the body has significantly longer to recover and it is able to restore itself more fully. It may be over the course of days, weeks or even months and it is whereby muscles can heal and regrow to the extent that the body adapts to be better able to perform whatever activity has been practiced. The factors of sleep and diet are crucial in long term recovery. While these forms of recovery are more passive, as fitness improves the body's ability to recover in the long term also becomes more efficient.

=== In sport ===
The ability to recover consciously and rapidly is one of the most important attributes that a sports person can develop. Their ability to immediately actively recover must be integrated with their sports specific skillset so that their performance is as efficient as possible. For example, a tennis player must learn to recover immediately after every stroke and a rugby player after every tackle. Successful sports people typically have the ability to recover faster and in a more controlled way.

=== In relation to the muscular system ===
For physical fitness to be maximised via training, the related strength and conditioning training does not just focus on the ability to perform work but also on the ability to quickly recover. The training of these two essential and complementary factors allows for a greater level of overall fitness to be achieved. Such training additionally focuses on ensuring that the relative strengths and sizes of the body’s muscles exist in particular proportions to each other in order to maximise the efficiency of the muscular system overall i.e. the calves are not excessively large relative to the quadriceps which would reduce biomechanical efficiency and lead to greater levels of fatigue.

The efficiency and speed of recovery can be improved through physical training. In terms of immediate active recovery after exertion, the body’s musculature can be strengthened to enhance it. This can take a variety of forms.

In terms of energy, a person’s recovery is related to the function of their heart which plays a key role in energy regulation. The heart can be strengthened directly through aerobic and anaerobic exercise and its effectiveness optimised by the influence of skeletal muscles which aid blood circulation. In the latter example, the movement of the gluteals, quadriceps and hamstrings helps to pump blood up from the legs and around the body. The calves perform a similar function to the extent that they are known colloquially as the body’s ‘second heart’. When these muscles are stronger and operate more effectively, it reduces the workload on the heart, reduces the potential for strain and fatigue, and means that a greater level of recovery can be achieved more quickly. Considered more generally, stronger skeletal muscles mean that the circulation of blood around the body is improved and therefore so too is the rate the recovery of energy can be achieved at.

Breathing and the ability to regain and control breath most effectively can be enhanced through the training and strengthening of the thoracic diaphragm muscle and the torso muscles that support its function such as the abdominal, intercostal, oblique and pelvic muscles. In general terms, this may be called core strength training. Improving the efficiency of these muscles means that breathing can be performed in a more controlled and comprehensive way, and more powerfully. Overall, this means that a person can regain their breath quicker during and after exercise.

The recovery of balance and the speed with which it can be regained can be improved through the strengthening of stabilising muscles such as the deep core muscles, lower leg muscles and hip muscles. When these muscles are stronger and work more efficiently both static and dynamic balance can be achieved faster and more effectively meaning greater levels of physical control can be achieved.

== Forms of training ==
=== Task-specific training ===
Task-specific, also known as task-oriented, fitness refers to a person's ability to perform in a specific activity, such as sports or military service, efficiently. Task-specific training prepares athletes to perform well in their sport through the training of the same, or closely associated, actions. These include:

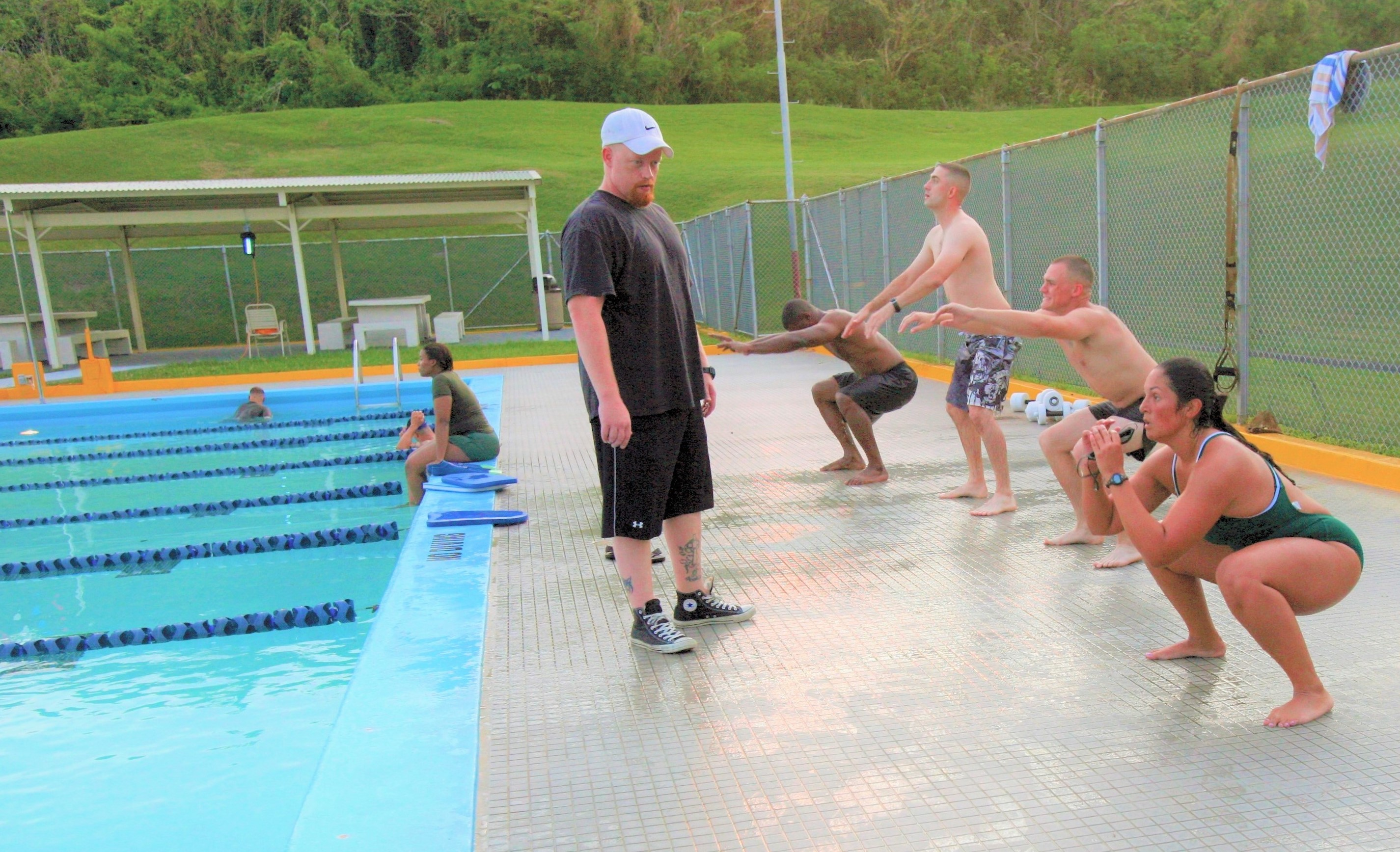
Swimmers in competitive swimwear perform squats prior to entering the pool in a U.S. military base, 2011.

- 100 m sprint: In a sprint, the athlete must be trained to work anaerobically throughout the race, an example of how to do this would be interval training.
- Century ride: Cyclists must be prepared aerobically for a bike ride of 100 miles or more.
- Middle distance running: Athletes require both speed and endurance to gain benefit out of this training. The hard-working muscles are at their peak for a longer period of time as they are being used at that level for the longer period of time.
- Marathon: In this case, the athlete must be trained to work aerobically, and their endurance must be built-up to a maximum.
- Many firefighters and police officers undergo regular fitness testing to determine if they are capable of the physically demanding tasks required of the job.
- Members of armed forces are often required to pass a formal fitness test. For example, soldiers of the U.S. Army must be able to pass the Army Physical Fitness Test (APFT).
- Hill sprints: Requires a high level of fitness to begin with; the exercise is particularly good for the leg muscles. The Army often trains to do mountain climbing and races.
- Plyometric and isometric exercises: An excellent way to build strength and increase muscular endurance.
- Sand running creates less strain on leg muscles than running on grass or concrete. This is because sand collapses beneath the foot, which softens the landing. Sand training is an effective way to lose weight and become fit, as more effort is needed (one and a half times more) to run on the soft sand than on a hard surface.
- Aquajogging is a form of exercise that decreases strain on joints and bones. The water supplies minimal impact to muscles and bones due to the buoyancy of the water offsetting body weight, which is good for those recovering from injury. Furthermore, the resistance of the water as one jogs through it provides an enhanced effect of exercise (the deeper you are, the greater the force needed to pull your leg through).
- Swimming: Squatting exercise helps in enhancing a swimmer's start.

For physical fitness activity to benefit an individual, the exertion must trigger a sufficient amount of stimuli. Exercise with the correct amount of intensity, duration, and frequency can produce a significant amount of improvement. The person may overall feel better, but the physical effects on the human body take weeks or months to notice—and possibly years for full development. For training purposes, exercise must provide a stress or demand on either a function or tissue. To continue improvements, this demand must eventually increase little over an extended period of time. This sort of exercise training has three basic principles: overload, specificity, and progression. These principles are related to health but also enhancement of physical working capacity.

=== High intensity interval training ===
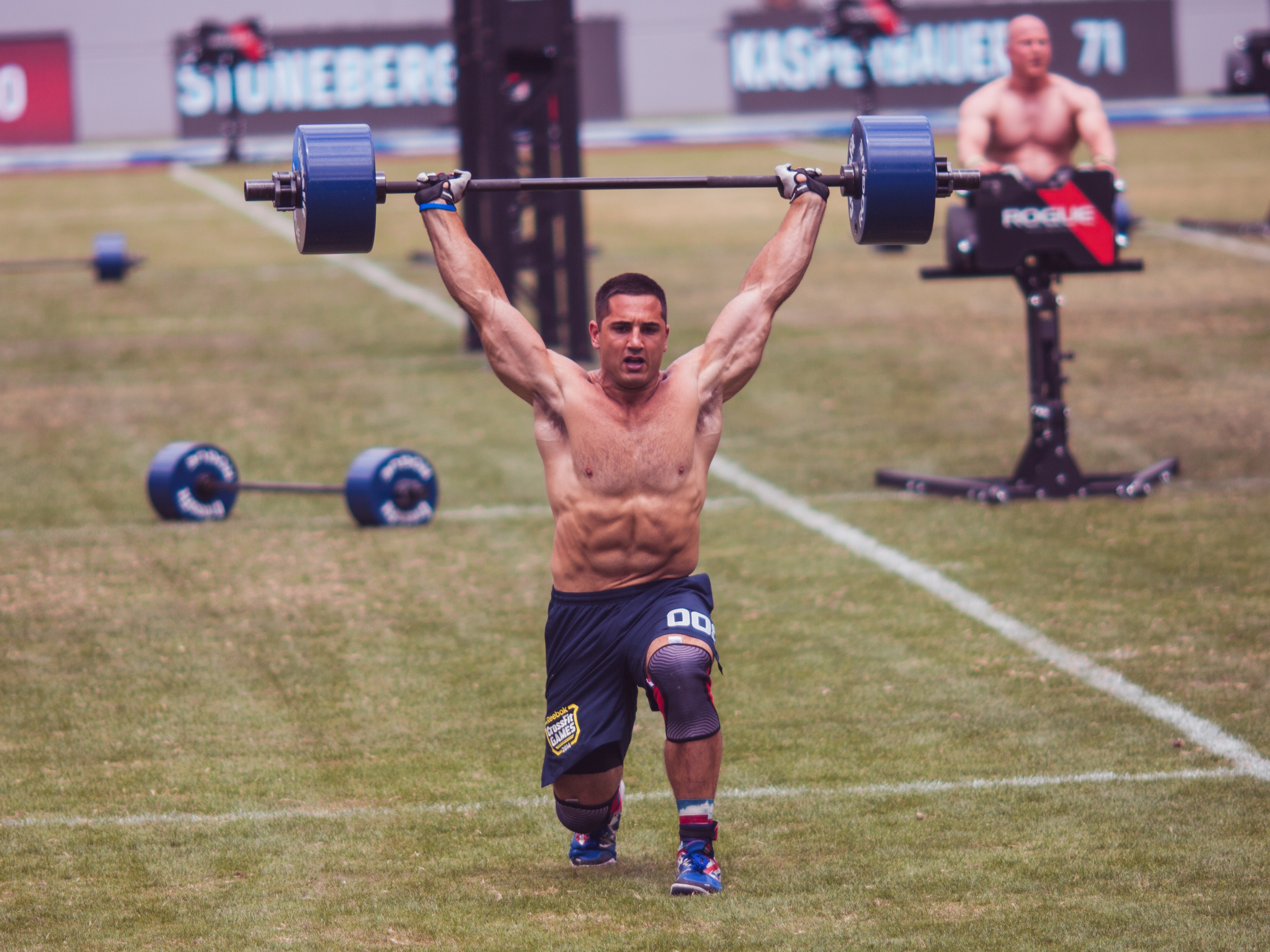
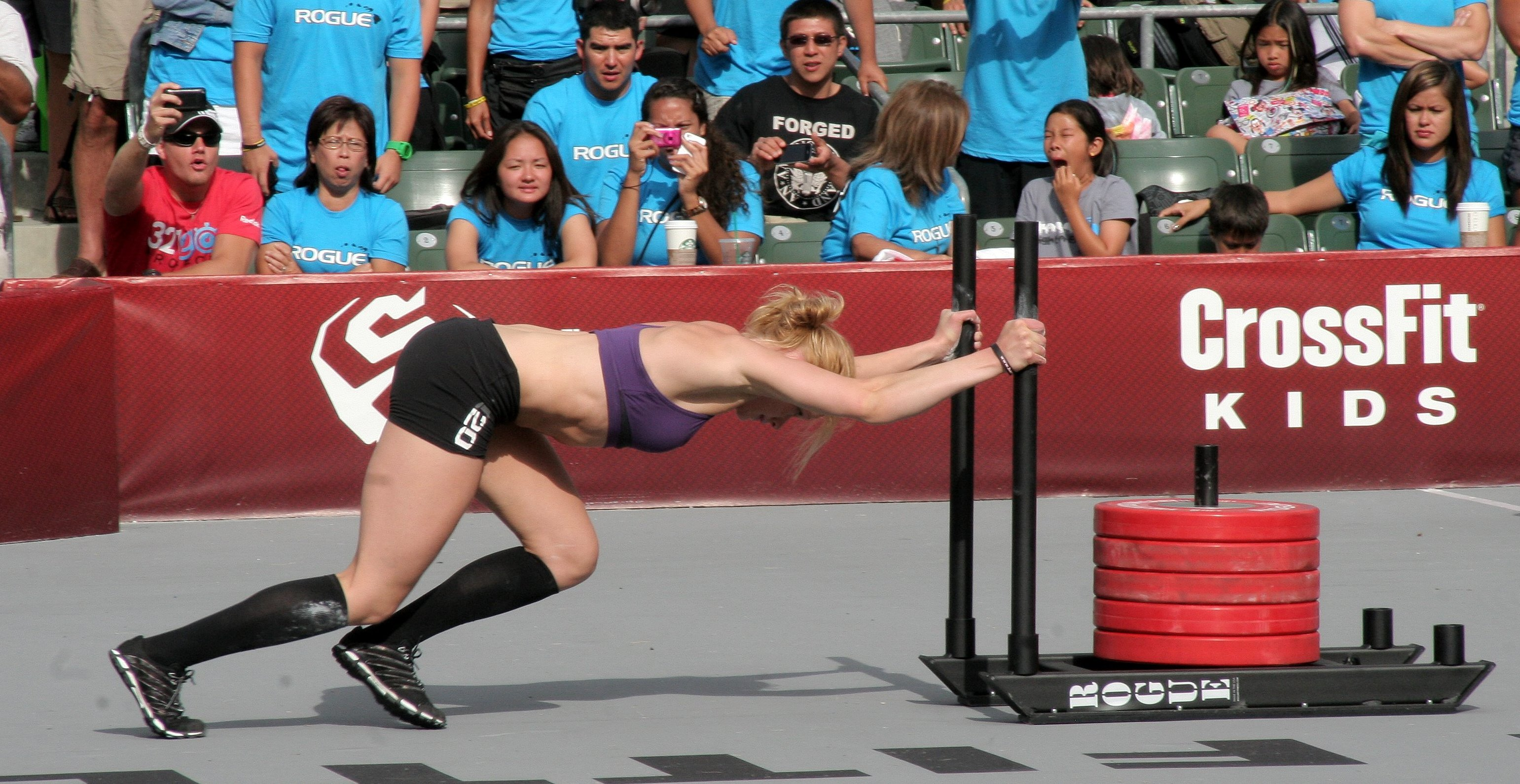
A man and a woman participating in high intensity events during a fitness competition

High-intensity interval training (HIIT) consists of repeated, short bursts of exercise, completed at a high level of intensity. These sets of intense activity are followed by a predetermined time of rest or low-intensity activity. Studies have shown that exercising at a higher intensity can have the effect of increasing cardiac benefits for humans when compared with exercising at a low or moderate level. When one's workout consists of a HIIT session, their body has to work harder to replace the oxygen it lost. Research into the benefits of HIIT have shown that it can be very successful for reducing fat, especially around the abdominal region. Furthermore, when compared to continuous moderate exercise, HIIT proves to burn more calories and increase the amount of fat burned post- HIIT session. Lack of time is one of the main reasons stated for not exercising; HIIT is a great alternative for those people because the duration of a HIIT session can be as short as 10 minutes, making it much quicker than conventional workouts.

== Effects ==
=== Controlling blood pressure ===
Physical fitness has been proven to support the body's blood pressure. Staying active and exercising regularly builds a stronger heart. The heart is the main organ in charge of systolic blood pressure and diastolic blood pressure. Engaging in a physical activity raises blood pressure. Once the subject stops the activity, the blood pressure returns to normal. The more physical activity, the easier this process becomes, resulting in a fitter cardiovascular profile. Through regular physical fitness, it becomes easier to create a rise in blood pressure. This lowers the force on the arteries, and lowers the overall blood pressure.

=== Cancer prevention ===
Centers for disease control and prevention provide lifestyle guidelines for maintaining a balanced diet and engaging in physical activity to reduce the risk of disease. The WCRF/ American Institute for Cancer Research (AICR) published a list of recommendations that reflect the dietary and exercise behaviors which are proven to reduce incidence of cancer.

The WCRF/AICR recommendations include the following:

- Be as lean as possible without becoming underweight.
- Each week, adults should engage in at least 150 minutes of moderate-intensity physical activity or 75 minutes of vigorous-intensity physical activity.
- Children should engage in at least one hour of moderate or vigorous physical activity each week.
- Be physically active for at least thirty minutes every day.
- Avoid sugar, and limit the consumption of energy-packed foods.
- Balance one's diet with a variety of vegetables, grains, fruits, legumes, etc.
- Limit sodium intake and the consumption of red meats and processed meats.
- Limit alcoholic drinks to two for men and one for women a day.

These recommendations are also widely supported by the American Cancer Society. The guidelines have been evaluated and individuals who have higher guideline adherence scores have substantially reduced cancer risk as well as improved outcomes of a multitude of chronic health problems. Regular physical activity is a factor that helps reduce an individual's blood pressure and improves cholesterol levels, two key components that correlate with heart disease and type 2 diabetes. The American Cancer Society encourages the public to "adopt a physically active lifestyle" by meeting the criteria in a variety of physical activities such as hiking, swimming, circuit training, resistance training, lifting, etc. It is understood that cancer is not a disease that can be cured by physical fitness alone, however, because it is a multifactorial disease, physical fitness is a controllable prevention. The large associations between physical fitness and reduced cancer risk are enough to provide a strategy of preventative interventions. The American Cancer Society asserts different levels of activity ranging from moderate to vigorous to clarify the recommended time spent on a physical activity. These classifications of physical activity consider intentional exercise and basic activities performed on a daily basis and give the public a greater understanding of what fitness levels suffice as future disease prevention.

=== Inflammation ===
Studies have shown an association between increased physical activity and reduced inflammation. It produces both a short-term inflammatory response and a long-term anti-inflammatory effect. Physical activity reduces inflammation in conjunction with or independent of changes in body weight. However, the mechanisms linking physical activity to inflammation are unknown.

=== Immune system ===
Physical activity boosts the immune system. This is dependent on the concentration of endogenous factors (such as sex hormones, metabolic hormones and growth hormones), body temperature, blood flow, hydration status and body position. Physical activity has been shown to increase the levels of natural killer (NK) cells, NK T cells, macrophages, neutrophils and eosinophils, complements, cytokines, antibodies and T cytotoxic cells. However, the mechanism linking physical activity to immune system is not fully understood.

=== Weight control ===
Achieving resilience through physical fitness promotes a vast and complex range of health-related benefits. Individuals who keep up physical fitness levels generally regulate their distribution of body fat and prevent obesity. Studies prove that running uses calories in the body that come from the macronutrients eaten daily. In order for the body to be able to run, it will use those ingested calories, therefore it will burn calories. Abdominal fat, specifically visceral fat, is most directly affected by engaging in aerobic exercise. Strength training has been known to increase the amount of muscle in the body, however, it can also reduce body fat. Sex steroid hormones, insulin, and appropriate immune responses are factors that mediate metabolism in relation to abdominal fat. Therefore, physical fitness provides weight control through regulation of these bodily functions.

=== Menopause and physical fitness ===
Menopause is often said to have occurred when a woman has had no vaginal bleeding for over a year since her last menstrual cycle. There are a number of symptoms connected to menopause, most of which can affect the quality of life of a woman involved in this stage of her life. One way to reduce the severity of the symptoms is to exercise and keep a healthy level of fitness. Prior to and during menopause, as the female body changes, there can be physical, physiological or internal changes to the body. These changes can be reduced or even prevented with regular exercise. These changes include:

- Preventing weight gain: around menopause women tend to experience a reduction in muscle mass and an increase in fat levels. Increasing the amount of physical exercise undertaken can help to prevent these changes.
- Reducing the risk of breast cancer: weight loss from regular exercise may offer protection from breast cancer.
- Strengthening bones: physical activity can slow the bone loss associated with menopause, reducing the chance of bone fractures and osteoporosis.
- Reducing the risk of disease: excess weight can increase the risk of heart disease and type 2 diabetes, and regular physical activity can counter these effects.
- Boosting mood: being involved in regular activities can improve psychological health, an effect that can be seen at any age and not just during or after menopause.

The Melbourne Women's Midlife Health Project followed 438 women over an eight-year period providing evidence showing that even though physical activity was not associated with vasomotor symptoms (more commonly known as hot flashes) in this cohort at the beginning, women who reported they were physically active every day at the beginning were 49% less likely to have reported bothersome hot flushes. This is in contrast to women whose level of activity decreased and were more likely to experience bothersome hot flushes.

=== Mental health ===
Studies have shown that physical activity can improve mental health and well-being. This improvement is due to an increase in blood flow to the brain, allowing for the release of hormones as well as a decrease of stress hormone levels in the body (e.g., cortisol, adrenaline) while also stimulating the human body's mood boosters and natural painkillers. Not only does exercise release these feel-good hormones, it can also help relieve stress and help build confidence. The same way exercising can help humans to have a healthier life, it also can improve sleep quality. Based on studies, even 10 minutes of exercise per day can help insomnia. These trends improve as physical activity is performed on a consistent basis, which makes exercise effective in relieving symptoms of depression and anxiety, positively impacting mental health and bringing about several other benefits. For example:

- Physical activity has been linked to the alleviation of depression and anxiety symptoms.
- In patients with schizophrenia, physical fitness has been shown to improve their quality of life and decrease the effects of schizophrenia.
- Being fit can improve one's self-esteem, as seen in the University of Tabriz's study.
- Working out can improve one's mental alertness and it can reduce fatigue.
- Studies, such as the one performed at The University of Chicago's Department of Psychiatry and Behavioral Neuroscience, have shown a reduction in stress levels.
- Increased opportunity for social interaction, allowing for improved social skills

To achieve some of these benefits, the Centers for Disease Control and Prevention suggests at least 30–60 minutes of exercise 3-5 times a week.

- Different forms of exercise have been proven to improve mental health and reduce the risk of depression, anxiety, and suicide.
- Benefits of Exercise on Mental health include ... Improved sleep, Stress relief, Improvement in mood, Increased energy and stamina, Reduced tiredness that can increase mental alertness. There are beneficial effects for mental health as well as physical health when it comes to exercise.

== History ==
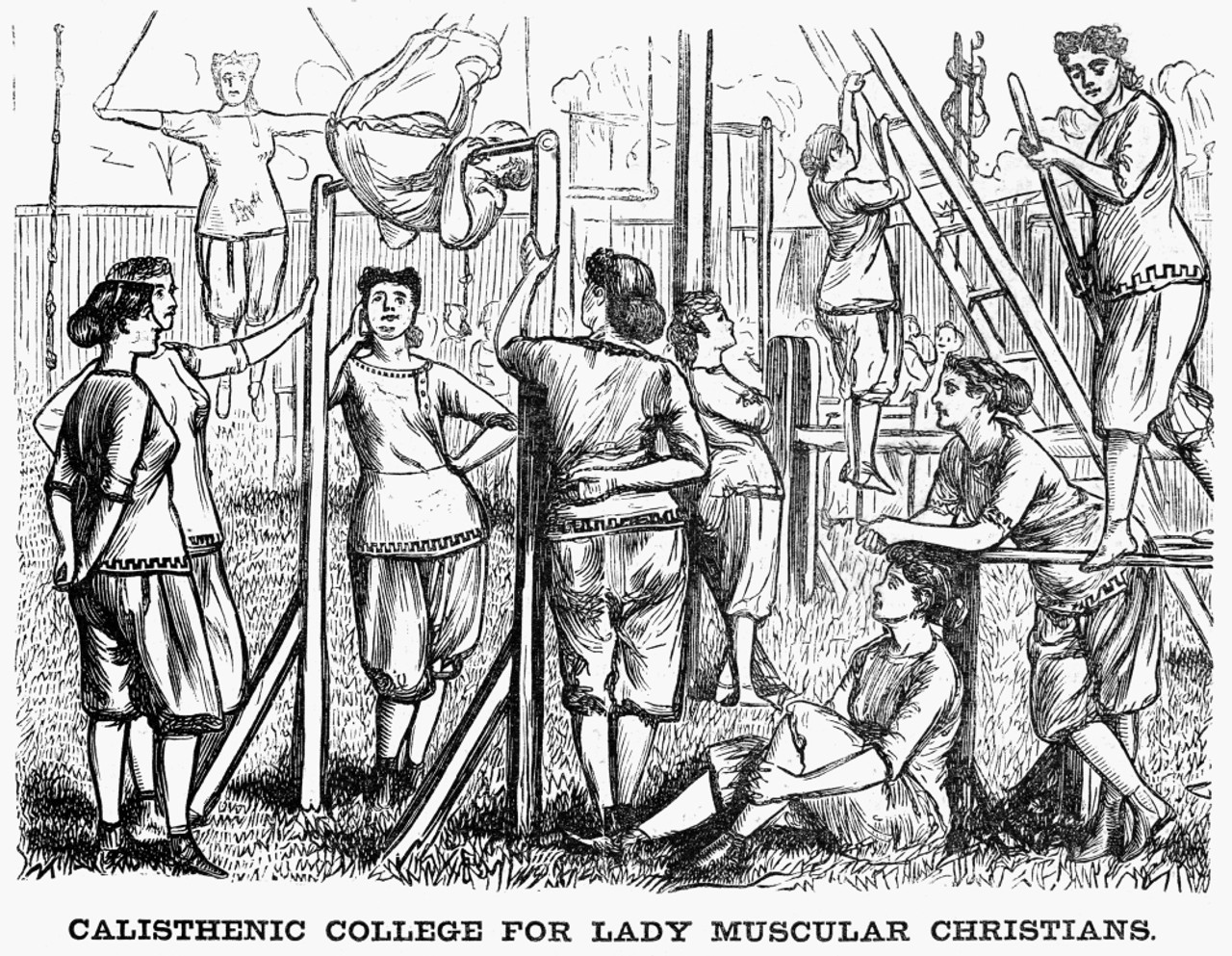
Ladies performing a common 19th-century fitness routine including climbing the underside of a ladder, balancing and gymnastics

In the 1940s, an emigrant M.D. from Austria named Hans Kraus began testing children in the U.S. and Europe for what he termed, "Muscular Fitness." (in other words, muscular functionality) Through his testing, he found children in the U.S. to be far less physically capable than European children. Kraus published some alarming papers in various journals and got the attention of some powerful people, including a senator from Pennsylvania who took the findings to President Dwight D. Eisenhower. President Eisenhower was "shocked." He set up a series of conferences and committees; then in July 1956, Eisenhower established the President's Council on Youth Fitness.

In Greece, physical fitness was considered to be an essential component of a healthy life and it was the norm for men to frequent a gymnasium. Physical fitness regimes were also considered to be of paramount importance in a nation's ability to train soldiers for an effective military force. Partly for these reasons, organized fitness regimes have been in existence throughout known history and evidence of them can be found in many countries.

Gymnasiums which would seem familiar today began to become increasingly common in the 19th century. The industrial revolution had led to a more sedentary lifestyle for many people and there was an increased awareness that this had the potential to be harmful to health. This was a key motivating factor for the forming of a physical culture movement, especially in Europe and the USA. This movement advocated increased levels of physical fitness for men, women, and children and sought to do so through various forms of indoor and outdoor activity, and education. In many ways, it laid the foundations for modern fitness culture.

== Education ==
The following is a list of some institutions that educate people about physical fitness:

- American Council on Exercise (ACE)
- National Academy of Sports Medicine (NASM)
- International Sports Science Association (ISSA)

== See also ==
- 20th century women's fitness culture
- Bodybuilding – Control and development of musculature
- Fitness fashion – Sociocultural phenomenon surrounding exercise and physical fitness
- Fitness professional
- Fundamental movement skill – Learned ability involving specific body movements for a task
- Healthy diet – Type of diet
- History of physical training and fitness – Historical physical training methods
- Outline of exercise – Exercise is physical activity that improves health
- Personal trainer – Individual who provides others with fitness training and instruction
- Power training – Common type of speed and strength training
- Thermoregulation in humans – Aspect of homeostasis
- Unilateral exercise – Single limb physical exercise
