= Hannibal (disambiguation) =

Hannibal (247–183/182 BC) was a Carthaginian general who fought the Roman Republic in the Second Punic War.

Hannibal may also refer to:

== Names ==
- Hannibal (given name)
- Hannibal (surname)

== Film and television ==
- Hannibal, a 1972 film by Xavier Koller
- Hannibal, a meerkat in Meerkat Manor

=== About the general and statesman from Carthage ===
- Hannibal (1959 film), a film based on the life of the Carthaginian general
- Hannibal (2006 TV film), a BBC TV film starring Alexander Siddig

=== Related to the novel The Silence of the Lambs ===
- Hannibal (2001 film), a sequel to the 1991 film based on Thomas Harris' novel, starring Anthony Hopkins
- Hannibal (TV series), a 2013 NBC TV drama series

== Games ==
- Hannibal (video game), a 1994 PC/DOS computer game
- Hannibal: Rome vs. Carthage, a 1996 Avalon Hill board game
- USS Hannibal, a space cruiser in 2005 Quake 4 console game

== Literature ==
- Hannibal (Harris novel), a novel by Thomas Harris and featuring Hannibal Lecter
- Hannibal (Leckie novel), a 1995 historical novel by Ross Leckie
- Hannibal, a dog in Agatha Christie's novel Postern of Fate

== Music ==
- Hannibal Records, a now-defunct record label
- "Hannibal", a track by Santana from Zebop!
- "Hannibal", a track by Miles Davis from Amandla
- Hannibal, a fictional opera in The Phantom of the Opera

== People ==
- Hannibal Gisco (c. 295–258 BC), Carthaginian military commander who fought the Roman Republic in the First Punic War
- Hannibal Heister, 18th century military commander of Imperial Army
- Hannibal Hamlin (1809-1891), the 15th vice president of the United States
- Hannibal Lokumbe or Hannibal (born 1948), American jazz trumpeter and composer
- Hannibal, a ring name of Devon Nicholson (born 1982), Canadian professional wrestler
- Hannibal Mejbri (born 2003), Tunisian professional footballer

== Places ==
=== United States ===
- Hannibal, Missouri, a city and hometown of Mark Twain
  - Hannibal micropolitan area
  - Hannibal Regional Airport
- Hannibal, New York, a town
  - Hannibal (village), New York, a village contained within the town
- Hannibal, Ohio, a census-designated place
- Hannibal, Wisconsin, an unincorporated community

=== Elsewhere ===
- Hannibal Islands, Queensland, Australia
- 2152 Hannibal, an asteroid

== Ships ==
- HMS Hannibal, various ships and a shore establishment
- USS Hannibal (Ag-1), a converted steamer
- Hannibal (slave ship), a 17th-century slave-trading ship

== Structures ==
- Hannibal (Dortmund), two multi-use high-rise buildings in Dortmund, Germany
- Hannibal Bridge, spanning the Missouri River
- Hannibal House, an office building in London

== Other uses ==
- Hannibal (G.I. Joe), a clone of the Carthaginian general in the G.I. Joe universe
- Hannibal (horse) (1801–c. 1806), a Thoroughbred racehorse that won the 1804 Epsom Derby
- Hannibal (network), a network of far-right prepper groups in German-speaking countries
- Operation Hannibal, a Second World War German sea evacuation of soldiers and civilians ahead of the advancing Red Army
- Hannibal-TV, a privately owned television network in Tunisia
- G-AAGX Hannibal, a named Handley Page H.P.42 airliner

== See also ==
- Aníbal (name), the Spanish equivalent
- Annibal (disambiguation)
- Annibale, the Italian equivalent of the given name
- Hanbal
- Hannibal Directive, a controversial secret Israel Defense Forces directive
- HMS Hannibal, a list of ships of the Royal Navy
- The Mighty Hannibal, stage name of American R&B singer James Shaw
- Torstenson War or Hannibal War, a conflict between Sweden and Denmark–Norway (1643–1645)
