= Annibali =

Annibali (pronounced [anˈniːbali]) is an Italian surname from Central Italy, derived from the given name Annibale. Notable people with the surname include:

- Domenico Annibali (c. 1705–1779), Italian castrato
- Flaminius Annibali de Latera (1733–1813), Italian historian
- Lucia Annibali (born 1977), Italian lawyer and politician

== See also ==
- Nibali
