= Annibal =

Annibal is the French masculine given name equivalent to Hannibal.

It may refer to:

== People ==
- Annibal Camoux (1638?–1759), French soldier noted for his claimed longevity
- Annibal de Coconnas (died 1574), a co-conspirator of Joseph Boniface de La Môle against King Charles IX of France
- Annibal Grimaldi (died 1621), Count of Beuil and governor of the County of Nice

== Ships ==
- French ship Annibal, six ships of the French Navy
- Annibal-class ship of the line, a type of 74-gun ship of the French Navy

== Other uses ==
- Annibal (Marivaux), an 18th-century play by Pierre de Marivaux

== See also ==
- Annibale, the Italian form of the name
- Aníbal (name), the Spanish and Portuguese form of the name
- Anibal Zahle, a Lebanese sports club based in Zahle, Lebanon
