= HMS Hannibal =

Six ships and a shore establishment of the Royal Navy have been named HMS Hannibal after the Carthaginian leader Hannibal:

- HMS Hannibal (1779) was a 50-gun fourth rate launched in 1779 and captured by the French in 1782.
- HMS Hannibal (1782) was a 14-gun sloop purchased in 1782, and foundered in 1788.
- HMS Hannibal (1786) was a 74-gun third rate launched in 1786 and captured by the French during the first part of the Battle of Algeciras Bay on 5 July 1801.
- HMS Hannibal (1810) was a 74-gun third rate launched in 1810. She was on harbour service from 1825 and was broken up in 1833.
- HMS Hannibal was to have been a 90-gun second rate. She was ordered in 1840, but was cancelled and reordered as the next HMS Hannibal.
- HMS Hannibal (1854) was a 91-gun screw propelled second rate launched in 1854. She was hulked in 1874 and was sold in 1904.
- HMS Hannibal (1896) was a Majestic-class battleship launched in 1896. She served as a troopship during the First World War and was sold in 1920.

== Shore establishment ==
- HMS Hannibal (shore establishment) was a naval base, commissioned at Algiers in 1943 and paid off in 1945. It was recommissioned in 1945 and paid off in 1946.

== Hired armed vessel ==
- Hired armed ship Hannibal was a ship of about 16 guns that the Royal Navy hired in 1804 and lost on 16 November of that same year near Sandown, Isle of Wight.

== See also ==
- French ship Annibal
- USS Hannibal
