= Nibali =

Nibali (pronounced [ˈniːbali]) is an Italian surname from Sicily, derived from the given name Annibale. Notable people with the surname include:

- Antonio Nibali (born 1992), Italian racing cyclist, brother of Vincenzo
- Vincenzo Nibali (born 1984), Italian racing cyclist, brother of Antonio

== See also ==
- Annibali
