= The Silence of the Lambs (film) =

1991 horror film by Jonathan Demme

- Theatrical release poster
- Directed by: Jonathan Demme
- Screenplay by: Ted Tally
- Based on: The Silence of the Lambs by Thomas Harris
- Produced by: Kenneth Utt; Edward Saxon; Ron Bozman
- Starring: Jodie Foster; Anthony Hopkins; Scott Glenn; Ted Levine
- Cinematography: Tak Fujimoto
- Edited by: Craig McKay
- Music by: Howard Shore
- Production company: Strong Heart Productions
- Distributed by: Orion Pictures
- Release dates: January 30, 1991 (New York City); February 14, 1991 (United States)
- Running time: 118 minutes
- Country: United States
- Language: English
- Budget: $19 million
- Box office: $272.7 million

The Silence of the Lambs is a 1991 American psychological horror thriller film directed by Jonathan Demme and written by Ted Tally, adapted from Thomas Harris's 1988 novel. It stars Jodie Foster as Clarice Starling, a young FBI trainee who is hunting a serial killer known as "Buffalo Bill" (Ted Levine), who skins his female victims. To catch him, she seeks the advice of the imprisoned Hannibal Lecter (Anthony Hopkins), a brilliant psychiatrist and cannibalistic serial murderer. The film also features performances by Scott Glenn, Anthony Heald, and Kasi Lemmons.

Released by Orion Pictures on February 14, 1991, the film grossed $272.7 million worldwide on a $19 million budget and became the fifth-highest-grossing film of the year. It premiered at the 41st Berlin International Film Festival, where Demme won the Silver Bear for Best Director. At the 64th Academy Awards, it became the third—and most recent—film to win the "Big Five" categories: Best Picture, Best Director, Best Actor, Best Actress, and Best Adapted Screenplay. It remains the only horror film to have won Best Picture.

The Silence of the Lambs is regularly cited by critics, film directors, and audiences as one of the greatest and most influential films. In 2017, Empire ranked it 48th on its list of the 500 greatest movies of all time. The American Film Institute ranked it the sixty-fifth greatest film in American cinema and the fifth-greatest thriller, while Starling and Lecter were included among the greatest film heroines and villains. The film was deemed "culturally, historically, or aesthetically" significant by the U.S. Library of Congress and was selected for preservation in the National Film Registry in 2011.

The film has drawn criticism for its portrayal of gender identity, particularly regarding the character of Buffalo Bill, which some critics argue perpetuates harmful stereotypes. Demme defended the film's intentions, arguing that it merely tells the personal story of "a tormented man".

The film was followed by the sequel Hannibal (2001), the prequels Red Dragon (2002) and Hannibal Rising (2007), a play and two television series.

== Plot ==
Clarice Starling, a young FBI trainee at Quantico, is recruited by Unit chief Jack Crawford to interview Dr. Hannibal Lecter, a brilliant and cannibalistic psychiatrist imprisoned at the Baltimore State Hospital for the Criminally Insane. Officially conducting a psychological survey, Starling is actually meant to draw out insights that could help capture "Buffalo Bill", a serial killer who murders young women and removes their skin.

At the hospital, the director Dr. Frederick Chilton makes unwelcome advances toward Starling before escorting her to Lecter's cell. Initially courteous, Lecter grows dismissive upon deducing Crawford's ulterior motive. As Starling departs, inmate Miggs flings semen at her, provoking Lecter's ire. He summons her back and offers an anagram as a clue that leads her to a storage unit containing a severed head in a jar—later revealed to belong to Benjamin Raspail, a former patient of Lecter whose killer is believed to be Buffalo Bill. Soon afterward, Miggs is found dead, having swallowed his own tongue—orchestrated by Lecter as retribution. Lecter agrees to assist in exchange for a transfer away from Chilton. Meanwhile, another victim is discovered with a death's-head moth lodged in her throat—the same species later found inside the severed head.

When Buffalo Bill abducts Catherine Martin, daughter of U.S. Senator Ruth Martin, Crawford authorizes Starling to offer Lecter a fraudulent deal: a prison transfer in return for actionable intelligence. Lecter instead demands a quid pro quo, extracting personal details from Starling, who reveals that her father, a police officer, was murdered when she was ten, leaving her orphaned. In exchange, Lecter reveals that Buffalo Bill is not a genuine transsexual but mistakenly believes he is, having possibly been rejected from gender-reassignment clinics due to psychological instability. Chilton secretly records the conversation, exposes her deceit, and offers Lecter relocation in exchange for information. Lecter complies and is flown to Memphis, where he provides Senator Martin with accurate details about Buffalo Bill's appearance but falsely identifies him as "Louis Friend". Meanwhile, Buffalo Bill holds Catherine captive in a dry well in his basement, demanding she apply lotion to her skin; Catherine manages to seize his dog, Precious, as leverage.

Starling deciphers "Louis Friend" as an anagram for "iron sulfide" (fool's gold) and confronts Lecter in his temporary cell at a courthouse. Lecter demands deeper revelations and offers a clue—"we covet what we see every day"—before Starling recounts a traumatic childhood incident: after her father's death, she lived on a relative's Montana farm, where she failed to save spring lambs from slaughter. Lecter intuits that saving Catherine might silence this recurring trauma and, satisfied, returns the case files. That night, he uses a piece of Chilton's pen to unlock his restraints, murders two guards, and escapes in an ambulance disguised in a dead guard's uniform and skinned face.

Analyzing Lecter's annotations, Starling deduces that Buffalo Bill knew his first victim, Frederika Bimmel, a tailor from Ohio, and follows the lead. At Bimmel's home, she finds unfinished dresses and patterns matching patches of skin removed from the victims, realizing Bill seeks to construct a "suit" of human flesh and starves his plump captives to loosen their skin. Crawford cross-references Lecter's profile with names from Johns Hopkins and the Known Offenders database, identifying Jame Gumb as the prime suspect; the name is confirmed through LAX customs papers listing Gumb as the addressee of live death's-head moth caterpillars imported from Suriname. While Crawford's team raids Gumb's vacant Calumet City residence, Starling interviews Bimmel's acquaintances and arrives at a house where Gumb poses as "Jack Gordon". His façade crumbles when Starling spots a death's-head moth.

Pursuing Gumb into his basement, Starling discovers Catherine trapped in the well. Gumb stalks Starling in complete darkness using night-vision goggles, but betrays his position by cocking his revolver; Starling fires instinctively and kills him. Catherine is rescued.

Starling graduates from the FBI Academy. During the post-ceremony party, Lecter calls from an unnamed location, asking whether "the lambs have stopped screaming." He assures her he has no intention of pursuing her and asks that she return the favor—a request she declines. Lecter announces he is "having an old friend for dinner" before stalking Chilton into a crowd.

== Cast ==
- Jodie Foster as Clarice Starling
  - Masha Skorobogatov as young Clarice
- Anthony Hopkins as Dr. Hannibal Lecter
- Scott Glenn as Jack Crawford
- Ted Levine as Jame "Buffalo Bill" Gumb
- Anthony Heald as Dr. Frederick Chilton
- Brooke Smith as Catherine Martin
- Diane Baker as U.S. Senator Ruth Martin
- Kasi Lemmons as Ardelia Mapp
- Charles Napier as Lt. Bill Boyle
- Tracey Walter as Lamar
- Roger Corman as FBI Director Hayden Burke
- Ron Vawter as Paul Krendler
- Danny Darst as Sgt. Tate
- Frankie Faison as Barney Matthews
- Paul Lazar as Pilcher
- Dan Butler as Roden
- Chris Isaak as SWAT commander
- Stuart Rudin as Miggs
- Darla as the dog, Precious
- Cynthia Ettinger as Officer Jacobs
- Brent Hinkley as Officer Murray
- Alex Coleman as Sgt. Jim Pembry
- Daniel von Bargen as SWAT communicator
- Harry Northup as Mr. Bimmel
- Lauren Roselli as Stacy Hubka
- George A. Romero as a jailer (uncredited)

== Production ==
=== Development ===
The movie is based on the 1988 novel by Thomas Harris. It was the second film to feature the character Hannibal Lecter; the first, Manhunter (1986), directed by Michael Mann, was based on the first novel in the Lecter series, Red Dragon (1981). Prior to the release of the Silence of the Lambs novel, Orion Pictures partnered with Gene Hackman to adapt it for film. With Hackman set to direct and star as either Jack Crawford or Hannibal Lecter, negotiations were made to split the $500,000 cost of rights between Hackman and the studio. The producers also had to acquire the rights to the Lecter character, which were owned by Manhunter producer Dino De Laurentiis. Owing to the financial failure of Manhunter, De Laurentiis lent the rights to Orion for free.

In November 1987, Ted Tally was brought on to write the adaptation; Tally had crossed paths with Harris many times, with his interest in adapting The Silence of the Lambs originating from receiving an advance copy of the book from Harris. When Tally was about halfway through with the first draft, Hackman withdrew from the project as his children wanted him to stop doing violent films, and financing fell through. However, Orion co-founder Mike Medavoy encouraged Tally to keep writing as the studio took care of financing, and searched for a replacement director. Amblin Entertainment passed on the project as they felt it was out of character for Steven Spielberg to direct. Orion sought Jonathan Demme to direct. With the screenplay not yet completed, Demme signed on after reading the novel. From there, the project developed quickly; Tally said: "[Demme] read my first draft not long after it was finished, and we met. Then I was just startled by the speed of things. We met in May 1989 and were shooting in November. I don't remember any big revisions."

=== Casting ===
Jodie Foster was interested in playing FBI agent Clarice Starling immediately after reading the novel. However, even though she had just won an Academy Award for Best Actress at the 61st Academy Awards for her performance in The Accused (1988), Demme was not initially convinced that she was right for the role. Demme's first choice for the role of Starling was Michelle Pfeiffer, with whom he had just collaborated on Married to the Mob (1988). Pfeiffer turned it down, later saying, "It was a difficult decision, but I got nervous about the subject matter." He then approached Meg Ryan, who also turned it down for its gruesome themes. The studio was skeptical about Laura Dern as a bankable choice, so Foster was ultimately awarded the role due to her passion for the character. Molly Ringwald auditioned but was deemed "too young".

For the role of Lecter, Demme originally approached Sean Connery. After Connery turned it down, Anthony Hopkins was offered the role based on his performance in The Elephant Man (1980). When Hopkins's agent told him that a script was on his way titled The Silence of the Lambs, Hopkins responded, "Is it a children's story?" Hopkins called his agent back after reading the first 10 pages and said, "This is the best part I've ever read." He accepted the role after having dinner with Demme.

Other actors considered for the role included Al Pacino, Robert De Niro, Dustin Hoffman, Jeremy Irons, Derek Jacobi and Daniel Day-Lewis. Forest Whitaker has stated that he also auditioned for the role. The mask Hopkins wore became an iconic symbol of the film. It was created by Ed Cubberly, of Frenchtown, New Jersey, who had made masks for NHL goalkeepers.

Hopkins developed his portrayal of Lecter by drawing inspiration from the HAL 9000 computer as voiced by Douglas Rain in 2001: A Space Odyssey, as well as the vocal patterns of writer Truman Capote. In a 2001 interview with GQ, Hopkins clarified that he did not base Lecter's vocal cadence on Katharine Hepburn, as some people had thought. He also revealed that the decision to play Lecter as still and unblinking was not influenced by Charles Manson, as some had speculated. Hopkins admitted to being intimidated by Foster, who had just won an Academy Award, and initially felt scared to talk to her.

Scott Glenn was cast to play Jack Crawford, the Agent-in-Charge of the Behavioral Science Unit of the FBI in Quantico, Virginia. In preparation for the role, Glenn met with John E. Douglas. Douglas gave Glenn a tour of the Quantico facility and also played for him an audio tape containing various recordings that serial killers Lawrence Bittaker and Roy Norris had made of themselves raping and torturing a 16-year-old girl. According to Douglas, Glenn wept as he listened to the recordings, and even changed his liberal stance on the death penalty.

=== Filming ===
Principal photography began on November 15, 1989, and wrapped on March 1, 1990. Filming primarily took place in and around Pittsburgh, Pennsylvania. The Victorian home in Perryopolis, Pennsylvania, used as Buffalo Bill's home in the film went up for sale in August 2015 for $300,000. The home sat on the market for nearly a year, before finally selling for $195,000. The exterior of the Western Center near Canonsburg, Pennsylvania, served as the setting for Baltimore State Hospital for the Criminally Insane. A scene set in the FBI Director's office was filmed in the office of United States Secretary of Labor Elizabeth Dole in Washington, D.C. In what was a rare act of cooperation at the time, the FBI allowed scenes to be filmed at the FBI Academy in Quantico; some FBI staff members even acted in bit parts.

The design for the basement and pit used by Buffalo Bill was inspired by the real-life kidnappings and murders performed by Gary M. Heidnik.

=== Music ===
Professional ratings
Review scores
Source	Rating
AllMusic	4/5 stars
Filmtracks	3/5 stars

The musical score was composed by Howard Shore, who would also collaborate with Demme on Philadelphia. Recorded in Munich during the latter half of the summer of 1990, the score was performed by the Munich Symphony Orchestra. "I tried to write in a way that goes right into the fabric of the movie", explained Shore on his approach. "I tried to make the music just fit in. When you watch the movie you are not aware of the music. You get your feelings from all elements simultaneously, lighting, cinematography, costumes, acting, music. Jonathan Demme was very specific about the music." The music editor was Suzana Peric. A soundtrack album was released by MCA Records on February 5, 1991. Music from the film was later used in the trailers for its 2001 sequel, Hannibal.

In addition to Shore's score, recordings of popular music are used prominently in the film. This includes British post-punk music, such as the song "Hip Priest" by the Fall which can be heard playing during the climactic scene in which Starling enters Buffalo Bill's house. The song "Goodbye Horses" by Q Lazzarus became a cult hit after it was featured in an iconic scene with Buffalo Bill applying makeup and speaking to himself in the mirror.

== Release and reception ==
=== Box office ===
The Silence of the Lambs was released on February 14, 1991, grossing almost $14 million from 1,497 theaters over the four-day Presidents' Day weekend, placing at number one at the US box office. It remained at number one for five weeks.

The film opened at the Odeon Leicester Square in London in June 1991 and grossed £290,936 in its opening week, which distributor Rank claimed was a world record opening week from one theatre. The following week, it expanded to 281 screens and grossed £4,260,472 for the week, a UK record.

The film grossed $131 million in the United States and Canada with a total worldwide gross of $273 million. It was the fourth-highest grossing film of 1991 in North America and the fifth-highest-grossing film worldwide.

=== Critical response ===
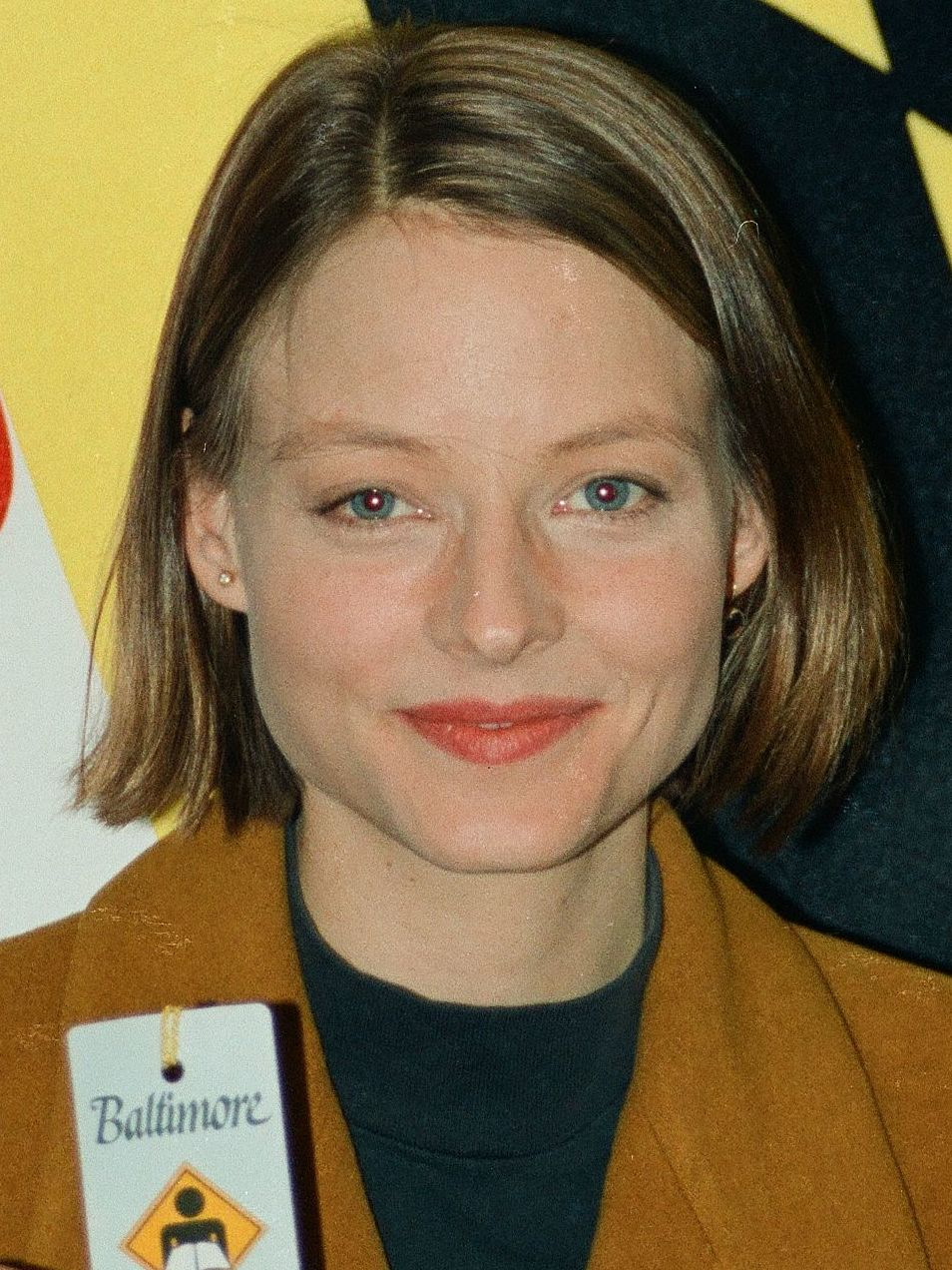
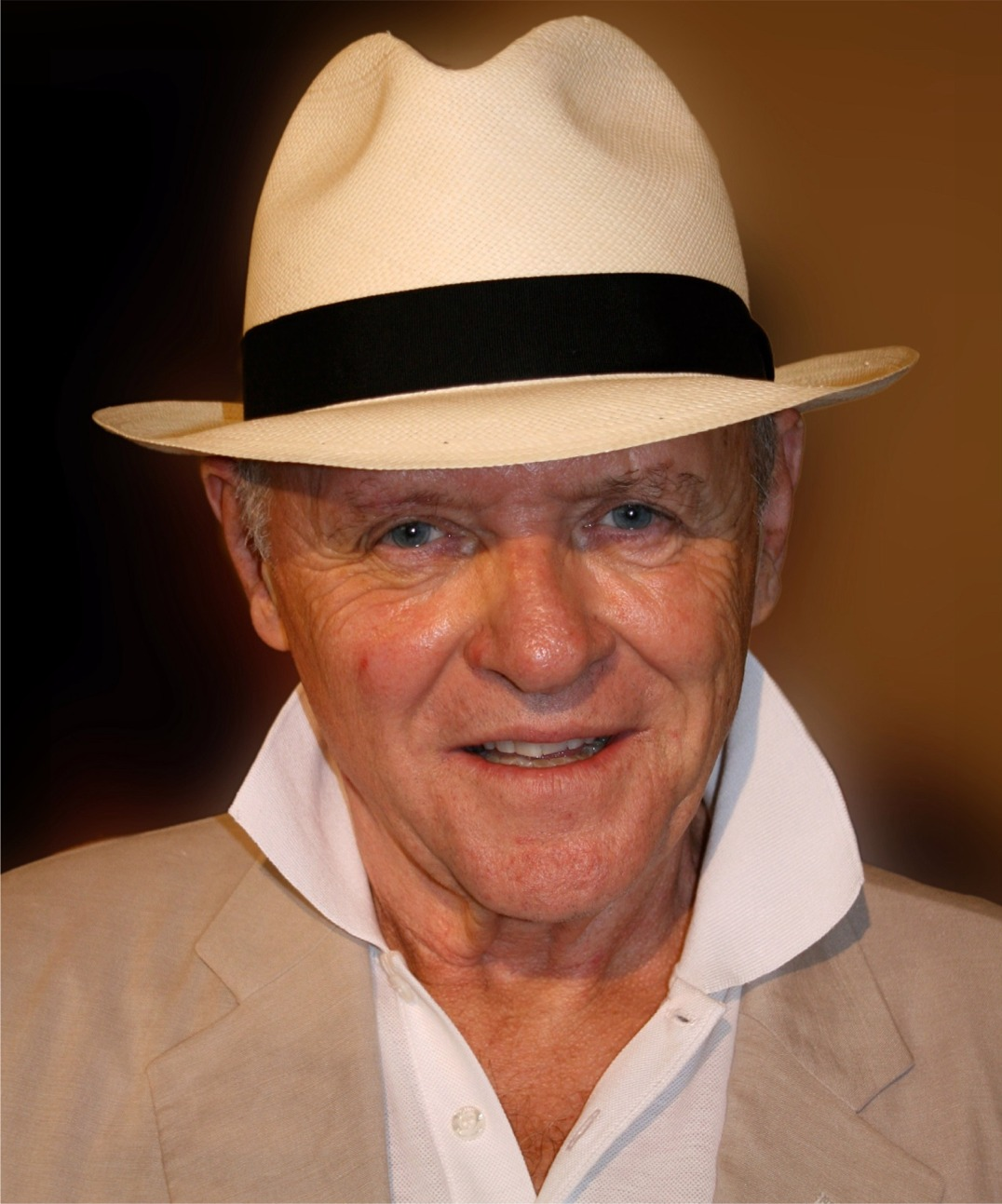
The performances of Jodie Foster and Anthony Hopkins garnered widespread critical acclaim, earning them the Academy Awards for Best Actress and Best Actor, respectively.

Foster, Hopkins, and Levine garnered much acclaim for their performances. On the review aggregator website Rotten Tomatoes, 95% of 154 critics' reviews are positive. The website's consensus reads: "Director Jonathan Demme's smart, taut thriller teeters on the edge between psychological study and all-out horror, and benefits greatly from stellar performances by Anthony Hopkins and Jodie Foster." Metacritic, which uses a weighted average, assigned the film a score of 86 out of 100, based on 20 critics, indicating "universal acclaim". Audiences polled by CinemaScore gave the film an average grade of "A−" on an A+ to F scale.

Roger Ebert of the Chicago Sun-Times specifically mentioned the "terrifying qualities" of Hannibal Lecter. Ebert later added the film to his list of The Great Movies, recognizing the film as a "horror masterpiece" alongside such classics as Nosferatu, Psycho, and Halloween. However, the film is also notable for being one of two multi-Academy Award winners (the other being Unforgiven) to get a bad review from Ebert's colleague, Gene Siskel. Writing for the Chicago Tribune, Siskel said, "Foster's character, who is appealing, is dwarfed by the monsters she is after. I'd rather see her work on another case."

=== Controversy ===
In the years following its release, The Silence of the Lambs was subject to much criticism regarding its themes of sexuality and sexual politics. Throughout the film, Clarice Starling's gender is emphasized as a distinguishing feature, as she is a minority amongst her numerous male peers, though film scholar Barry Forshaw notes that "any feminist agenda is never bluntly formulated verbally".

Some gay male critics and feminists felt that the film's portrayal of Buffalo Bill negatively associated the LGBT community with deviance, psychopathy, and violence. Despite this, Bill's sexual orientation is never explicitly stated in the film, and Hannibal Lecter expressly states Bill is "not really transsexual". Director Jonathan Demme argued that this criticism was misguided, telling The New York Times that "I got all this unfounded abuse ... [Buffalo Bill] wasn't a gay character. He was a tormented man who hated himself and wished he was a woman because that would have made him as far away from himself as he possibly could be." Demme added that he "came to realize that there is a tremendous absence of positive gay characters in movies".

In a 1992 interview with Playboy magazine, the feminist and women's rights advocate Betty Friedan stated: "I thought it was absolutely outrageous that The Silence of the Lambs won four [sic] Oscars ... I'm not saying that the movie shouldn't have been shown. I'm not denying the movie was an artistic triumph, but it was about the evisceration, the skinning alive of women. That is what I find offensive. Not the Playboy centerfold."

The film has subsequently been criticized for transphobia by transfeminists, who claimed that it is "one of the most significant and impactful examples of pop culture transmisogyny" and it "encourages disbelief of trans people's self-identification" because of its claims that Bill is "not really transsexual" despite Bill applying to medically transition into a woman.

Edward Saxon, who co-produced the film, later regretted that the movie's portrayal of Bill related to anti-LGBTQ stereotypes. He recalled that "as we made the film, there was just no question in our minds that Buffalo Bill was a completely aberrant personality—that he wasn't gay or trans. He was sick. To that extent, we missed it. From my point of view, we weren't sensitive enough to the legacy of a lot of stereotypes and their ability to harm." Actor Ted Levine explained: "I didn't play [Buffalo Bill] as being gay or trans. I think he was just a fucked-up heterosexual man." However, Levine felt that parts of the movie did not hold up, stating that his concerns grew "over time and having gotten aware and worked with trans folks, and understanding a bit more about the culture and the reality of the meaning of gender ... It's unfortunate that the film vilified that, and it's fucking wrong."

=== Accolades ===
Academy Awards record
Best Picture, Edward Saxon, Kenneth Utt, Ronald M. Bozman
Best Director, Jonathan Demme
Best Actor, Anthony Hopkins
Best Actress, Jodie Foster
Best Adapted Screenplay, Ted Tally
Golden Globe Awards record
Best Actress, Jodie Foster
British Academy Film Awards record
Best Actor, Anthony Hopkins
Best Actress, Jodie Foster

The film won the Big Five Academy Awards: Best Picture, Best Director (Demme), Best Actor (Hopkins), Best Actress (Foster), and Best Adapted Screenplay (Ted Tally) at the 64th Academy Awards, making it only the third film in history to accomplish that feat, after It Happened One Night and One Flew Over the Cuckoo's Nest. It was also nominated for Best Sound (Tom Fleischman and Christopher Newman) and Best Film Editing (Craig McKay), but lost to Terminator 2: Judgment Day and JFK, respectively.

Other awards include Best Film by the National Board of Review of Motion Pictures as well as at the CHI Awards and PEO Awards. Demme won the Silver Bear for Best Director at the 41st Berlin International Film Festival and was nominated for the Golden Globe Award for Best Director at the 49th Golden Globe Awards. The film was nominated for the Grand Prix of the Belgian Film Critics Association. It was also nominated for the British Academy Film Award for Best Film at the 45th British Academy Film Awards. Screenwriter Ted Tally received an Edgar Award for Best Motion Picture Screenplay. The film was awarded Best Horror Film of the Year during the 2nd Horror Hall of Fame telecast, with Vincent Price presenting the award to the film's executive producer Gary Goetzman.

In 1998, the film was listed as one of the 100 greatest films in the past 100 years by the American Film Institute. In 2006, Writers Guild of America West ranked its screenplay 61st in its list of greatest screenplays. In the same year, at the Key Art Awards, the original poster for The Silence of the Lambs was named best film poster "of the past 35 years". The Silence of the Lambs placed seventh on Bravo's The 100 Scariest Movie Moments for Lecter's escape scene. The American Film Institute named Hannibal Lecter (as portrayed by Hopkins) the number one film villain of all time and Clarice Starling (as portrayed by Foster) the sixth-greatest film hero of all time.

In 2011, ABC aired a prime-time special, Best in Film: The Greatest Movies of Our Time, that counted down the best films chosen by fans based on results of a poll conducted by ABC and People magazine. The Silence of the Lambs was selected as the best suspense/thriller and Dr. Hannibal Lecter was selected as the fourth-greatest film character. In 2024, Far Out magazine included the character in a list of the "10 most accurate movie psychopaths", drawing on characteristics of psychopathy discussed by the FBI, while WhatCulture included Hopkins's portrayal in its list of "10 Most Convincing Movie Psychopath Performances". In 2012, the Motion Picture Editors Guild listed it as the 26th best-edited film of all time based on a survey of its membership.

The film and its characters have appeared in the following AFI "100 Years" lists:

- AFI's 100 Years...100 Movies – No. 65
- AFI's 100 Years...100 Thrills – No. 5
- AFI's 100 Years...100 Heroes & Villains:
  - Clarice Starling – No. 6 Hero
  - Hannibal Lecter – No. 1 Villain
- AFI's 100 Years...100 Movie Quotes:
  - "A census taker once tried to test me. I ate his liver with some fava beans and a nice Chianti." – No. 21
- AFI's 100 Years...100 Movies (10th Anniversary Edition) – No. 74

In 2015, Entertainment Weekly's 25th anniversary year, it included The Silence of the Lambs in its list of the 25 best movies made since the magazine's beginning. In 2016, the Directors Guild of America ranked the film 53rd on its list of "80 Best-Directed Films" since the Guild's founding in 1936.

Year	Award	Category	Nominee(s)	Result	Ref.
1991	Academy Awards	Best Picture	Edward Saxon, Kenneth Utt, and Ron Bozman	Won	
1991	Academy Awards	Best Director	Jonathan Demme	Won	
1991	Academy Awards	Best Actor	Anthony Hopkins	Won	
1991	Academy Awards	Best Actress	Jodie Foster	Won	
1991	Academy Awards	Best Adapted Screenplay	Ted Tally	Won	
1991	Academy Awards	Best Film Editing	Craig McKay	Nominated	
1991	Academy Awards	Best Sound	Tom Fleischman and Christopher Newman	Nominated	
1991	American Cinema Editors	Best Edited Feature Film	Craig McKay	Nominated	
1991	British Academy Film Awards	Best Film	Ron Bozman, Edward Saxon, Kenneth Utt	Nominated	
1991	British Academy Film Awards	Best Direction	Jonathan Demme	Nominated	
1991	British Academy Film Awards	Best Actor in a Leading Role	Anthony Hopkins	Won	
1991	British Academy Film Awards	Best Actress in a Leading Role	Jodie Foster	Won	
1991	British Academy Film Awards	Best Adapted Screenplay	Ted Tally	Nominated	
1991	British Academy Film Awards	Best Cinematography	Tak Fujimoto	Nominated	
1991	British Academy Film Awards	Best Editing	Craig McKay	Nominated	
1991	British Academy Film Awards	Best Film Music	Howard Shore	Nominated	
1991	British Academy Film Awards	Best Sound	Skip Lievsay, Christopher Newman, Tom Fleischman	Nominated	
1991	Directors Guild of America Awards	Outstanding Directorial Achievement in Motion Pictures	Jonathan Demme	Won	
1991	Golden Globe Awards	Best Motion Picture – Drama	Kenneth Utt	Nominated	
1991	Golden Globe Awards	Best Director	Jonathan Demme	Nominated	
1991	Golden Globe Awards	Best Actor – Motion Picture Drama	Anthony Hopkins	Nominated	
1991	Golden Globe Awards	Best Actress in a Motion Picture – Drama	Jodie Foster	Won	
1991	Golden Globe Awards	Best Screenplay	Ted Tally	Nominated	
1991	Los Angeles Film Critics Association	Best Music Score	Howard Shore	Runner-up	
1991	National Board of Review	Best Film		Won	
1991	National Board of Review	Best Director	Jonathan Demme	Won	
1991	National Board of Review	Best Supporting Actor	Anthony Hopkins	Won	
1991	National Society of Film Critics	Best Director	Jonathan Demme	Runner-up (3rd)	
1991	National Society of Film Critics	Best Actress	Jodie Foster	Runner-up (2nd)	
1991	New York Film Critics Circle	Best Film		Won	
1991	New York Film Critics Circle	Best Director	Jonathan Demme	Won	
1991	New York Film Critics Circle	Best Actor	Anthony Hopkins	Won	
1991	New York Film Critics Circle	Best Actress	Jodie Foster	Won	
1991	Producers Guild of America Awards	Outstanding Producer of Theatrical Motion Pictures	Edward Saxon, Kenneth Utt, and Ronald M. Bozman	Won	
1991	Saturn Awards	Best Horror Film		Won	
1991	Saturn Awards	Best Director	Jonathan Demme	Nominated	
1991	Saturn Awards	Best Actor	Anthony Hopkins	Won	
1991	Saturn Awards	Best Actress	Jodie Foster	Nominated	
1991	Saturn Awards	Best Writing	Ted Tally	Won	
1991	Saturn Awards	Best Music	Howard Shore	Nominated	
1991	Saturn Awards	Best Costumes	Colleen Atwood	Nominated	
1991	Saturn Awards	Best Make-up	Carl Fullerton and Neal Martz	Won	
1991	Writers Guild of America Awards	Best Screenplay Based on Material from Another Medium	Ted Tally	Won	

=== Home media ===
The film was released on VHS on October 24, 1991, by Orion Home Video. It was the most rented video in the United States upon release, and ended up as the second most rented video of 1992. The Criterion Collection released the film on LaserDisc in 1991 and 1994. It was released on DVD in 1997 by Image Entertainment, and reissued by Criterion in 1998. A special edition DVD was released by MGM Home Entertainment on March 6, 2001, in both widescreen (1.85:1) and full screen (1.33:1) versions. MGM released it on Blu-ray in 2009. Criterion released a remastered Blu-ray in 2018. It was released on Ultra HD Blu-ray by Kino Lorber in September 2021, using an existing 4K scan of the original camera negative made by MGM and supervised by cinematographer Tak Fujimoto. An Ultra HD Blu-ray from Criterion will be released on October 20, 2026.

== Sequels ==
The sequel Hannibal (2001) saw the return of only Hopkins after Foster and director Jonathan Demme declined to return because of the onscreen increase of violence and gore. Hopkins again returned to the role of Hannibal Lecter in the prequel film Red Dragon (2002) while another prequel, Hannibal Rising (2007), saw Gaspard Ulliel take over the role. The TV series Clarice (2021) takes place after the events of the film, with actress Rebecca Breeds portraying Clarice. The television series Hannibal (2013–2015) is based on characters and elements from Red Dragon, Hannibal, and Hannibal Rising by Thomas Harris.

== Legacy ==
According to The Guardian, before The Silence of the Lambs, serial killers in film had been "claw-handed bogeymen with melty faces and rubber masks. By contrast, Lecter was highly intelligent with impeccable manners", and played by an actor with "impeccable credentials".

When The Silence of the Lambs was re-released in the United Kingdom in 2017, the British Board of Film Classification reclassified it from an 18 to a 15 certificate. The film's co-producer Ed Saxon said audiences had become desensitized and that the film had become less shocking. However, the BBFC's Craig Lapper felt that audiences had instead become used to procedural crime dramas with serial killers as dramatic tropes, and suggested that The Silence of the Lambs had created interest in these themes.

During his 2024 presidential campaign, United States president Donald Trump repeatedly referenced Hannibal Lecter and The Silence of the Lambs, claiming that foreign governments were sending "insane asylum" patients and convicted criminals to the United States and comparing immigrants to the fictional character. Trump also described Lecter as "a wonderful man" and spoke of him as if he were real, prompting Anthony Hopkins to say he was "shocked and appalled".

== See also ==
- Cannibalism in popular culture
- List of Academy Award records
- List of films based on crime books
- List of films featuring psychopaths and sociopaths
- Silence! The Musical, an unauthorized parody musical adaptation of the film

== Sources ==
- Douglas, John E.; Olshaker, Mark (1995). Mindhunter: Inside the FBI's Elite Serial Crime Unit. New York City, New York: Scribner. ISBN 978-0-684-80376-0.
- Edwards, Carl N. (2001). Responsibilities and Dispensations: Behavior, Science, & American Justice. Dover, Massachusetts: Four Oaks Press. ISBN 978-0-9705128-8-8.
- Engel, Joel (1995). Screenwriters on Screen-Writing: The Best in the Business Discuss Their Craft. New York City, New York: Hyperion Books.
- Forshaw, Barry (2014). The Silence of the Lambs. New York City, New York: Columbia University Press. ISBN 978-1-906-73398-8.
- Kapsis, Robert E. (2008). Jonathan Demme: Interviews. Conversations With Filmmakers. Jackson, Mississippi: University Press of Mississippi. ISBN 978-1-60473-118-7.
- Kessler, Ronald (1993). The FBI. New York City, New York: Pocket Books. ISBN 978-0-671-78657-1.
- Konow, David (2012). Reel Terror: The Scary, Bloody, Gory, Hundred-Year History of Classic Horror Films. London: St. Martin's Press. ISBN 978-0-312-66883-9.
- Medavoy, Mike (2013). You're Only as Good as Your Next One: 100 Great Films, 100 Good Films, and 100 for Which I Should Be Shot. New York City, New York: Atria Books.
- Scott, Kevin Conroy (April 28, 2006). Screenwriters' Masterclass: Screenwriters Discuss their Greatest Films. New York City, New York: HarperCollins. ISBN 978-0-571-26158-1.
- Tasker, Yvonne (2019). The Silence of the Lambs. BFI Film Classics. London: Bloomsbury. ISBN 978-1-839-02058-2.
- Tiech, John (2012). Pittsburgh Film History: On Set in the Steel City. Stroud, Gloucestershire: The History Press. ISBN 978-1-60949-709-5.
