= Katrin Bennhold =

German journalist and foreign correspondent, born 1974

- Born: 14 August 1974 (age 52); Bremen, then part of West Germany
- Education: United World College - USA, M.Sc. in Economics, Nieman fellowship at Harvard
- Alma mater: London School of Economics
- Occupations: Journalist and foreign correspondent, podcast and newsletter host
- Years active: 2000–present
- Employer(s): The International Herald Tribune, The New York Times
- Known for: Reports about society and politics in Europe, host and lead writer for NYT newsletter The World
- Notable work: Day X, The Battle of Europe
- Awards: The New York Times Publisher's Award 2019

Katrin Margarethe Bennhold (born 1974) is a German journalist, foreign correspondent and writer, who has been working for more than 20 years for The International Herald Tribune (IHT) and The New York Times (NYT). As a commentator on European politics for an international readership, she is known for her reports on democracy, migration, gender issues, far-right extremism, and Europe's political culture.

After joining the IHT in 2004 and later the NYT, she has reported from Paris, London and Berlin. Since September 2025, she has been host and lead writer for The World newsletter, published for NYT readers outside the US.

== Life and career ==
=== Early life and education ===
Bennhold was born in Bremen and grew up in Osnabrück, both in the former West Germany. Her father was a professor of sociology and her mother first studied to become an engineer, but later became a school teacher. Described by Bennhold herself as "left-wing intellectuals", their political attitudes had been influenced by the 1968 student movement in Europe. After the end of the East German state in 1989, they became critical of the political developments caused by German reunification.

As a teenager, she first studied at a public secondary school in Osnabrück and later at the United World College in New Mexico. After studies at the London School of Economics, she graduated with a master's degree in economics in 1998.

=== Journalism ===
Bennhold began her journalistic career in 2000 as a writer about Economics for Bloomberg News and presenter on Bloomberg Television in Paris, as well as for Germany's N24 channel. Starting in 2004, she worked for the international desk at The International Herald Tribune (IHT), then owned by the NYT company. There, she covered major European stories including the 2004 Madrid train bombings, unrests in Paris, terrorism, and unlawful trading at one of the biggest French banks. While based in Paris, she also participated in podcasts produced by Radio France, expressing her views in French about US involvement in Iraq and then-president Barack Obama's foreign policy. Bennhold next served as correspondent at the NYT desk in London, becoming one of the newspaper's principal writers on German and European politics. Following this, she went on to work for the NYT bureau in Berlin.

Bennhold has written about European and US politics, terrorism, migration, gender equality, democracy, as well as about Germany's Nazi past and far-right extremism in Europe. In 2019, she published a story titled "Germany's Second-Richest Family Discovers a Dark Nazi Past". Based on a historical study about the family's companies in the 1930s and 1940s, she reported that the German Reimann family, today owners of JAB Holdings and companies including Krispy Kreme doughnuts and Calvin Klein perfume, had collaborated with the Nazi regime, using prisoners of war as forced laborers. In 2020, she reported about members of Neo-Nazi groups in the German military and police, and in 2021, she hosted a podcast about the case of Franco A., a German army officer implicated in a far-right terrorism scheme.

On 28 September 2025, Bennhold was announced as host and lead writer of NYT's global affairs daily newsletter The World. Published for readers outside the US, the newsletter aims at presenting selected stories by the newspaper's global network of correspondents. Her role as newsletter "host" means she will write The World herself, but also include colleagues from The New York Times or occasionally invite them to lead the newsletter. Additional features of this newsletter are short videos to provide information appropriate also for young folk. The World sees such videos as a response to a perceived rising tendency of general fatigue relating to news and reading.

=== Further activities ===
In 2012 and 2013, Bennhold was a Fellow of the Nieman Foundation for Journalism at Harvard University, studying the economics of gender and motherhood and the economic implications of gender equality in the early 21st century. One of the articles she wrote for the NYT based on her research about gender issues in Europe was titled "In Sweden, Men Can Have it All" and was reprinted in an academic book for selected reading.

As a public speaker, she has participated in international panels and academic discussions, including Oxford University's Dahrendorf Lectures and Bucerius Law School's Freedom Debates, addressing public views in European countries and the politics of international migration. In February 2026, Bennhold was invited along French journalist Elisa Braun to speak in a podcast about the memoir of Gisèle Pelicot and the Jeffrey Epstein files. In their introduction, the publishers noted a common fact between the two different cases: "Women remain the ultimate objects, to be subjugated by men."

== Awards and distinctions ==
- Premio Luchetta in 2016 for her reporting on child migrants
- The New York Times Publisher's Award in 2019
- American Young Leader of the French-American Foundation in 2008

== Personal life ==
Bennhold lives with her husband and children in Cardiff, the capital of Wales, United Kingdom.

== Publications ==
- Bennhold, Katrin (15 July 2018). "A Man Among Female Leaders: 'The Risk of Mansplaining is very High'". In The New York Times Editorial Staff (ed.). Women's Roles. The Rosen Publishing Group, Inc. pp. 151–155. ISBN 978-1-64282-069-0.
- Bennhold, Katrin (15 July 2018). "A Royal Christening in Britain Amid a Refrain of Coos". In The New York Times Editorial Staff (ed.). Royal Couples: Harry and Meghan Markle, William and Kate Middleton, and Charles and Diana. The Rosen Publishing Group, Inc. pp. 102–104. ISBN 978-1-64282-033-1.
- Bennhold, Katrin (2015). "In Sweden Men can have it all". In Ohio State University Department of Women's Studies. (ed.). Selections from Reading Women's Lives. Boston, MA: Pearson Learning Solutions. ISBN 9781269772549. .

== Reception ==
In 2019, the Austrian public broadcaster ORF reported that Bennhold had interviewed right-wing activist and leader of the Identitarian Movement of Austria, Martin Sellner. Asking Bennhold why she intended to write an article about Sellner, she said she wanted to show her readers the extent to which hatred and extremism have become much more common than many people realize. Not speaking with people like Sellner would be to withhold information from the reader. Furthermore, it would be hypocritical to report on their ideas without quoting them directly. As her article was very critical of him, Bennhold did not believe that Sellner benefited from her article as this might have brought him much attention in the media.

In September 2021, Bennhold was interviewed in Berlin about the approaching end of German chancellor Angela Merkel's tenure by Christiane Armanpour for the public affairs TV program Amanpour and Company.

A 2023 article by Maxim Biller in the German national weekly Die Zeit described her family background, education, and career path from Paris to Berlin, London, and Cardiff. The article also discussed her interest in German political memory, her life as a German expatriate and the persistence of far-right ideology in Europe. Further, the author commented about her writing about terrorists and their victims, as well as her "brilliant podcast about Franco A.", who had planned terror attacks in Germany.

=== Criticism ===
In 2018, American conservative media watchdog group Media Research Center (MRC) published an article critical of Bennhold's reporting about Claas Relotius, a prominent writer and journalistic fraud at German news magazine Der Spiegel. MRC wrote Bennhold had made "a shocking case of German media malpractice all about Trump" for having referred to accusations by President Donald Trump about fake news in the media, following this with similar accusations by the far-right party Alternative for Germany and the suppression of media freedom during Nazi Germany. The same year, MRC opined that Bennhold had written "an incredibly ignorant paragraph about the freedoms of East German women", as she had called the lives of women in former East Germany in some ways more emancipated than in West Germany.
