= Monomachos =

Monomachos (Greek: Μονομάχος), or in Latin Monomachus, in Ukrainian and Russian Мономах (Monomakh), is a Greek epithet, meaning "he who fights alone" and "gladiator".

It applies specifically to:

- Monomachos (Byzantine family), a family of Byzantine officials
- Niketas Monomachos, Byzantine official and saint
- Constantine IX Monomachos, Byzantine emperor (r. 1042–1055)
- Theodosios Monomachos, nephew of the above, Byzantine official and usurper
- Michael Monomachos, 14th-century Byzantine general
- Vladimir II Monomakh, Rus' Grand Prince (r. 1113–1125)
  - Monomakhovichi, the dynasty founded by him
- Hannibal Monomachus, a friend and staff officer of the Carthaginian general Hannibal

== See also ==
- Monomakh's Cap, a symbol-crown of the Russian autocracy
- Monomachus Crown, a set of pieces of engraved Byzantine goldwork
