= Street workout =

Physical activity performed mostly in outdoor parks

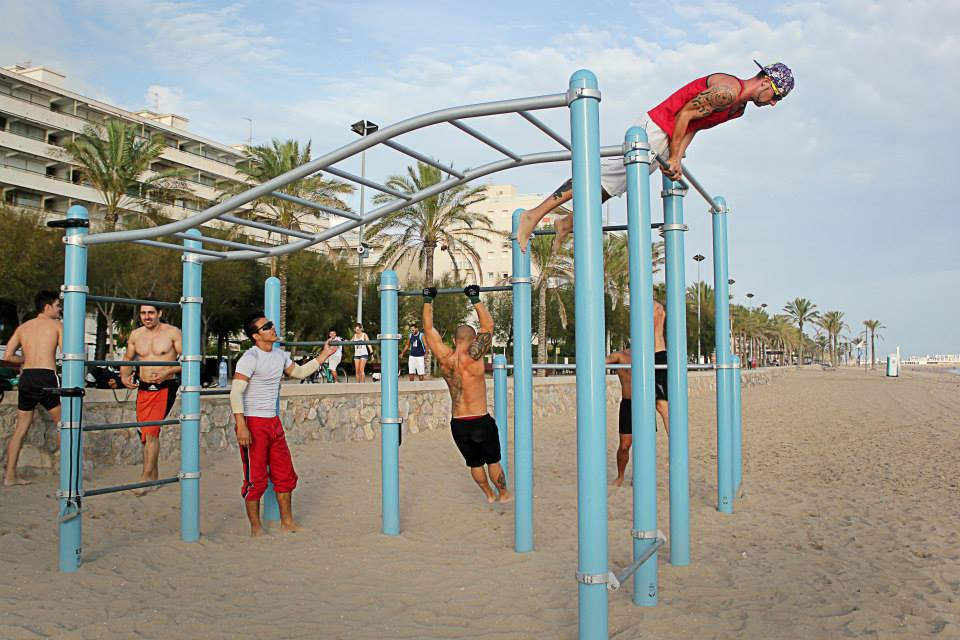
Street workout in Spain

Street workouts are a physical activity performed in outdoor parks or public facilities. The movement behind street workouts became popular in Russia, Israel, Myanmar, Morocco, Uzbekistan, Eastern Europe, and the United States, especially in New York City, Los Angeles, Chicago, Philadelphia, Miami, Baltimore, Washington, D.C., and other urban East Coast neighborhoods. It is a combination of athletics, calisthenics, and sports. "Street workout" is a modern name for calisthenics (or bodyweight workouts) in outdoor parks. There are also street workout teams and organized competitions for exercises such as pull-ups, chin-ups, push-ups, dips, rows, muscle-ups, sit-ups and squats. A street workout also involves static (isometric) holds such as the human flag, front lever, back lever, L-sit and planche.

Street workouts are divided into two main branches, strength training and dynamics. Strength training includes isometric holds such as the planche, the front lever, and the back lever. This form of exercise also includes single-arm pull-ups, muscle-ups, single-arm push-ups, and more. Dynamic exercises including switchblades can be connected with other moves in order, to create routines or sets.

Some of the benefits of street workouts according to those who do it are:

- It is completely free;
- It can be performed at any time anywhere
- No training or gym equipment is required;
- It promotes healthy living, and a desirable physique can be attained with it;
- It is a social event.

== History ==
With the invention of YouTube in 2005, groups and individuals began to upload videos and collectively gain tens of millions of views. Many calisthenics athletes, such as Hannibal For King, were able to rise to fame and inspire others within their respective communities and throughout the world to workout. Many competitions arose and grew to new heights during this time period because of mass exposure from YouTube. Hannibal is known for his great physique.

== Basics of street workout ==
A typical street workout routine consists of:

- Athletics – involves a system of exercises with various levels of exertion provided for development of strength and stamina as well as for shaping an athletic constitution. Exercising is used to increase strength level, develop physical shape and for rehabilitation.
- Isometric exercises – a type of strength training whereby a static position is held.
- Calisthenics – a complex of many simple exercises performed using purely body weight. The aim of the exercises is to train muscular strength and to evolve comprehensive fitness.A key component is the "muscle-up".

Street workouts are usually performed outdoors or in specifically designed street workout parks. A typical street workout park looks like a playground and consists of several bars, poles and other objects used for body weight exercises. In street workout, people often create teams. A notable athlete is Abu Asada.

== Streetlifting ==
Streetlifting is a strength sport that combines calisthenics and powerlifting. Streetlifting consists of three attempts at maximal weight on two lifts pull-up or chin-up and dip. Some competitions also include muscle-ups, and back squats. Streetlifting competitions also include a maximum repetition class where competitors only do bodyweight lifts, but for maximum repetitions instead of maximum weight.

== See also ==
- Outdoor fitness
- Outdoor gym
- Capoeira
- Freerunning
- Parkour
