= Hannibal (surname) =

Hannibal is a surname. Notable people with the surname include:

- Abram Petrovich Gannibal or Hannibal (1697–1781), African prince and Russian general
- Gary Hannibal (born 1943), American politician from Nebraska
- Ivan Gannibal (1735–1801), Russian general and Abram's son
- Heinrich Hannibal (1889–1971), German World War II SS officer
- Robin Hannibal (fl. 2003–present), Danish and musician and record producer
- Dr. Hannibal, the professional wrestling persona of Steven Gillespie
