= Hannibal (Dortmund) =

Multi-functional tower blocks in Dortmund

Coordinates: 51°31′15.603″N 7°28′13.855″E

Hannibal is the name of two multi-functional tower blocks in the city of Dortmund, Germany. They are located each in the districts of Innenstadt-Nord (also known as Nordstadt), as well as in Dorstfeld.

== Hannibal building of Nordstadt ==
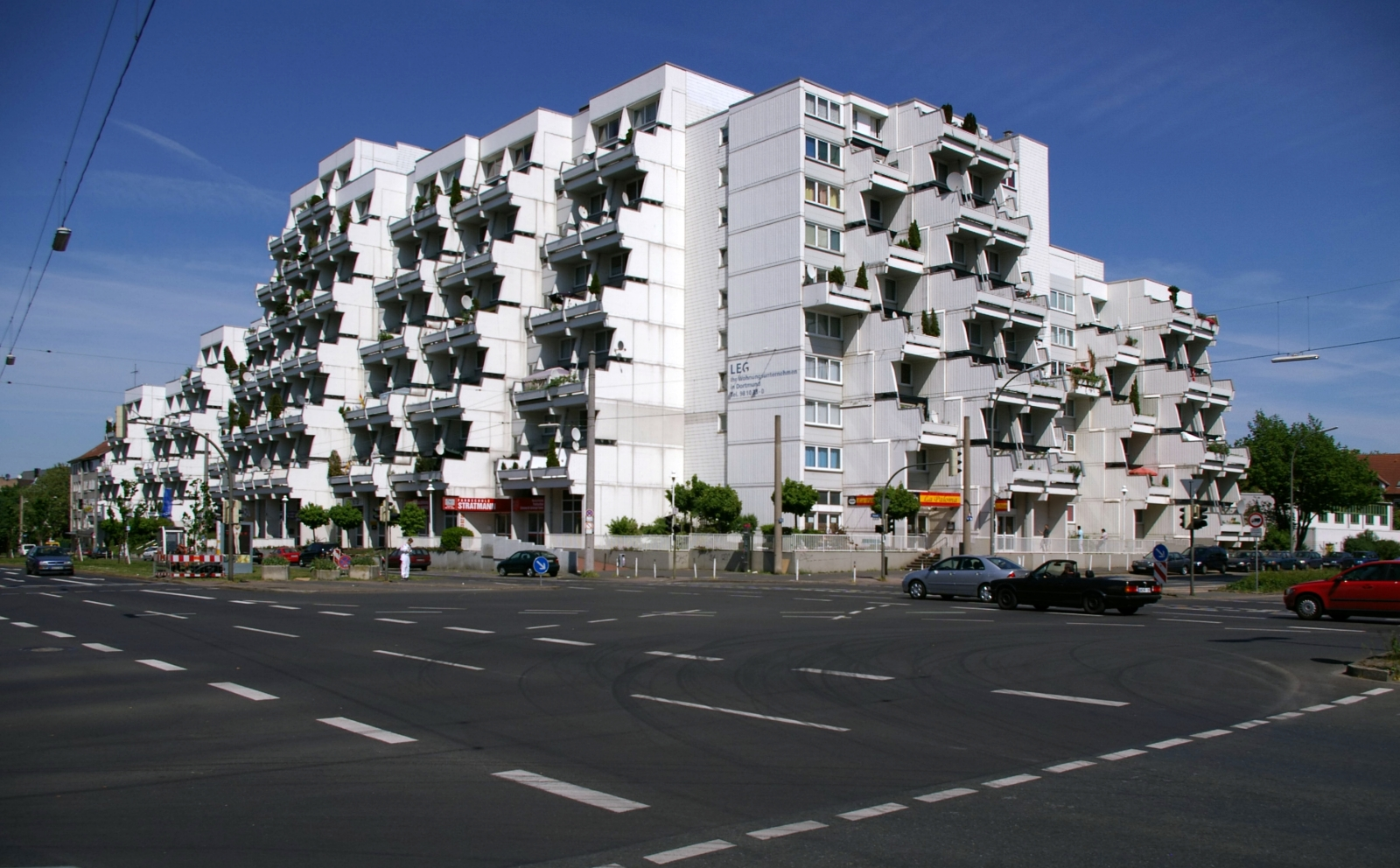
Hannibal building in the district of Innenstadt-Nord

In the district Innenstadt-Nord, a 50 metres high tower block was built in the 1970s.

The complex was built in 1972 by Neue Heimat using prefabricated construction methods, following a complete redevelopment under the Sanierungsgebiet Nord II (lit. Renewal Area North II) programme on Bornstraße in the Nordmarkt district. It was designed by the architects Günther Odenwaeller and Heinz Spieß.

From 1994 to 1999, the building was refurbished by the house owner LEG Nordrhein-Westfalen.

However, the building was sold in 2019 to the Merlion Wohnen located in Tortola, British Virgin Islands.

== Hannibal building of Dorstfeld ==
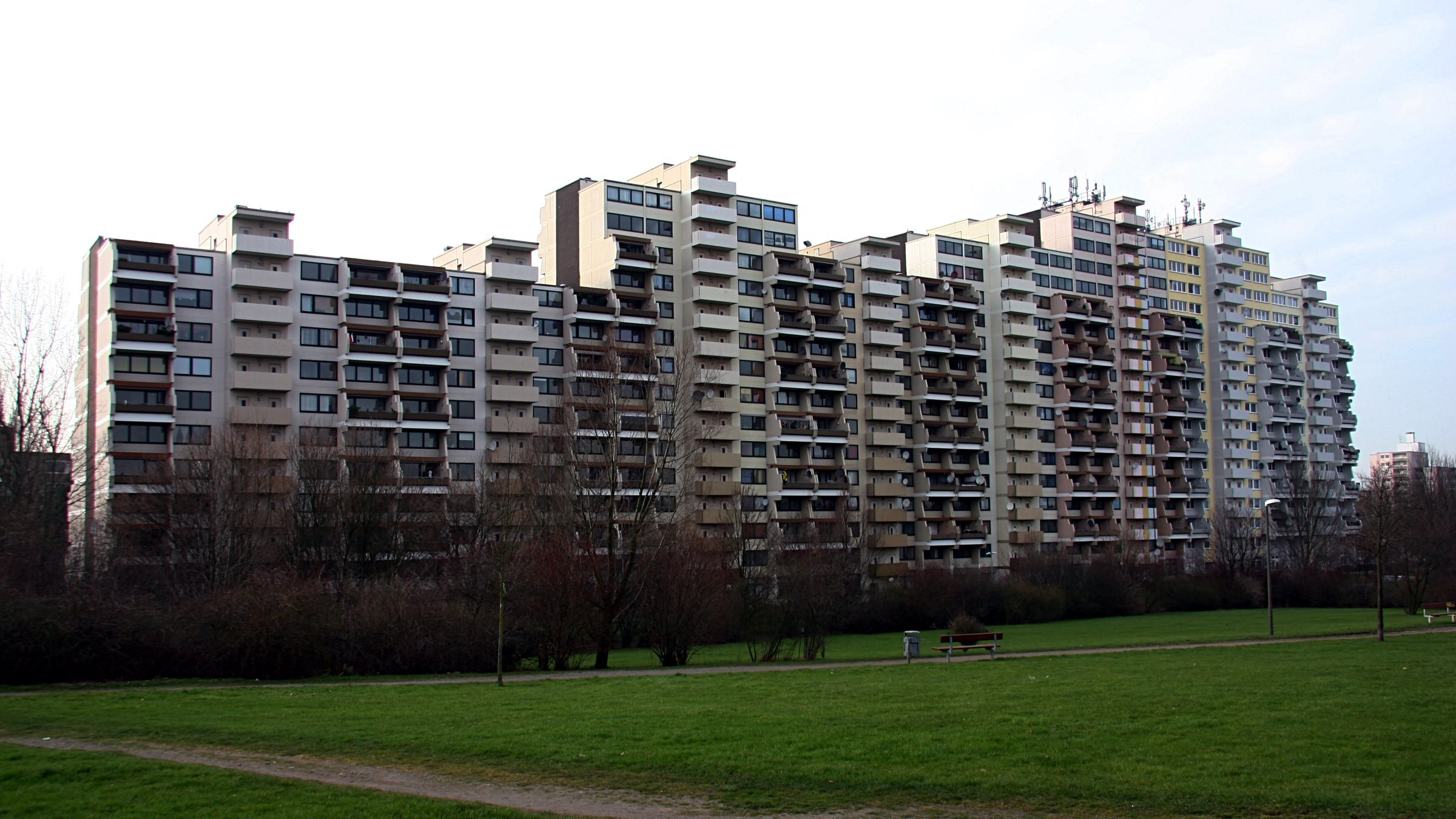
Hannibal building in the district of Dorstfeld

Likewise, in the district of Dorstfeld, a tower block with the same name was built in the 1970s.

The complex was built between 1972 and 1975 by Dogewo to similar designs by the architects Günther Odenwaeller and Heinz Spieß. Its current address is Vogelpothsweg 12–26. It consists of eight terraced high-rise blocks, each up to 16 storeys high, containing 412 flats ranging in size from 20 m² to 100 m², of which 304 are maisonettes and 108 are smaller, single-storey student flats.

=== Forced evacuation ===
During a fire safety inspection on 29 August 2017, numerous defects were identified which the owner was required to rectify. During a follow-up inspection on 19 September, further serious defects were noted in the escape routes. It was also discovered, quite by chance, that smoke could spread unhindered from the underground car parks into the residential areas and between floors via the continuous air and cable shafts. This is consistent with the concerns raised in the property valuation report prior to the auction of the complex.

=== Refurbishment ===
In February 2021, the Liège-based company Lütticher 49 Properties sold the complex. Whilst the Forte Group was initially named as the new owner, it later emerged that the group was overseeing the refurbishment and that the complex was owned by the Amsterdam-based company Dortmund Green Living B.V. According to Radio 91.2, as of July 2023, the building is owned by Forte Capital Deutschland of Frankfurt am Main.

Preparations for the refurbishment began in early 2022 with the dismantling of the building’s services and the bathrooms. A tender process was held for the new installations. The eight lifts that have been in place since the building was first completed are being replaced with new ones. The refurbishment was suspended for a period, but work has been continuing on the building since July 2023. It was first gutted in order to modernise it. As part of this, the building is to be fitted with ‘insulation and sustainable heat sources’.

As of September 2025, the first residential units are expected to be ready for occupancy in the first quarter of 2026.
