= Flaminius Annibali de Latera =

Italian historian

Flaminius Annibali de Latera (23 November 1733 at Latera, near Viterbo – 27 February 1813 at Viterbo) was an Italian historian.

He received his first education from a priest, Paolo Ferranti, and at the age of sixteen entered the Order of Friars Minor Observants in the Roman Province, taking the habit at the convent of St. Bernardine at Orte, 23 January 1750; a year later on the same day he made his solemn profession. Being in due time ordained priest, he passed his examinations as lector generalis (professor), and successively taught theology in various convents — Viterbo, Fano, Velletri, and Rome.

From 1790 to 1791 he was definitor general of the Roman Province . When the convents in Italy were suppressed by Napoleon I in 1810, Annibali retired to Viterbo, and died there in a private residence.

De Latera during fifty years developed immense activity as a writer. He lived at a time when Franciscan history had just passed through the great and passionate Spader-Ringhieri and Lucci- Marczic controversies. This had a notable influence on his writings: he wrote mostly with a polemical motive.

== Works (incomplete list) ==
"*Ad Bullarium Franciscanum a P. Hyacintho Sbaralea Ord. Min.Conv...editum, Supplementum" (Rome, 1780), dedicated to Pope Pius VI, by whose orders it was written to correct the Conventual interpretations of Sbaralea [see 'Archiv f. Litt. u. Kirchengeschichte", I (1885), 516–17.]

- "Manuale de' Frati Minori... con un'appendice, o sia risposta all'autore (P. Sangallo, O. M. Con.) del Saggio compendioso della dottrina di Giustino Febbronio (Rome, 1776). This latter work occasioned great controversies, which partly took a violent and abusive form.
- "Dissertationes critico-historicae in quarum una Ser. Patriarcha Franciscus Tertii Ordinis institutor, in altera Indulgentiae Portiunculae veritas assertir et vindicatur (Rome, 1784).
- "Veritas impressiones Sacrorum Stimatum in corpore Seraphici S. Francisci Assisiensis..."(Rome, 1786).
- "La storia della Indulgenza concessa da Gesu Cristo...nella Chiesa della Portiuncula si dimostra vera..." (Rome, 1796). The last three books were written against rationalistic attacks of the time, concerning which see Pezzana, "Memorie degli Scrittori e Letterati Parmigiani", VI, pt. I, 127 (Parma, 1825) When the Benedictine Pujati had, by order of Scipio Ricci, written against the traditional form of the Stations of the Cross, Annibali, with the Franciscans Affo and Tommasco da Cireglio, was charged to answer; he then wrote
- "La Pratica del pio Esercizio della Via Crucis...vendicata dalle obbiezioni di D. Giuseppe Ma Pujati, Monaco Casinese..." (Viterbo, 1783; 2nd ed., Viterbo, 1785).
- "La Difesa dell' antico metodo della Via Crucis e la Censura del nuovo..." (against the "Annali ecclesiastici" of Florence) (Viterbo, 1783). An important but little-known work is
- "Compendio della Storia degli Ordini religiosi esistensi (4 vols., Rome, 1790-91); 2nd ed. of the same with the title " Storia degli Ordini regolari...." (Naples, 1796).
- A life of St. Collette, in Italian (Rome, 1805; 2nd ed., Rome, 1807).
- Italian life of St. Hyacintha Mariscotti (Rome, 1805; 2nd ed., Rome, 1807).
- New edition of "F. Francisci Horantii Hispani (O. F. M.)... Locorum Catholicorum ...libri VII" (2 vols., Rome, 1795–96).
- Annibali worked on the reform of the Franciscan Breviary, 1784–85, and composed many new offices edited separately at Rome, 1785 (see "Archivum Franc. Hist.", I, Quaracchi, 1908, 45–49).
- An Italian hymn-book (Viterbo, 1772). (14) "Notizie storiche della Casa Farnese della fu Citta di Castro...coll' aggiunta di due Paesi Latera e Farnese" (in 2 parts, Montefiascone, 1817–18), which appeared after his death.
