= Aníbal =

Aníbal is the Spanish and Portuguese masculine given name equivalent of Hannibal (q.v.), itself a latinization of the Greek name Hanníbas (Ἁννίβας), derived from “ḥnbʿl” in the Punic language (𐤇𐤍𐤁𐤏𐤋), a descendant of the Phoenician Canaanite language in which the name's meaning is "Baal ([the] Lord) [is] my grace", a cognate of the Hebrew honorific Baʿal (בעל) “master/lord”.

In English, it may refer to:

- Aníbal (wrestler) stagename of Carlos Ignacio Carrillo Contreras (1940–1994), Mexican wrestler
- Aníbal Acevedo (born 1971), Puerto Rican boxer
- Aníbal Acevedo Vilá (born 1962), Puerto Rican politician
- Aníbal Alzate (1933–2016), Colombian footballer
- Aníbal Capela (born 1991), Portuguese footballer
- Aníbal Cavaco Silva (born 1939), Portuguese president
- Aníbal González (born 1963), Chilean footballer
- Aníbal González Irizarry (1927–2018), Puerto Rican broadcast journalist
- Aníbal Litvin, Argentine writer and journalist
- Aníbal López aka A-1 53167 (1964–2014), Guatemalan artist
- Aníbal Milhais (1895–1970), Portuguese soldier during World War I
- Aníbal Moreno (born 1999), Argentinian footballer
- Aníbal Muñoz Duque (1908–1987), Colombian cardinal of the Roman Catholic church
- Aníbal Pinto Garmendia (1825–1884), president of Chile
- Aníbal Pinto Santa Cruz (1919–1996), Chilean economist
- Aníbal Sánchez (born 1984), Venezuelan baseball player
- Aníbal Troilo (1914–1975), Argentine tango musician
- Aníbal Zurdo (born 1982), Mexican footballer

== See also ==
- Anibal Zahle, Lebanese sports club based in Zahle. Club's name is a reference to Hannibal the Great
- Annibal (disambiguation)
- Annibale, the Italian version of the given name
- Hannibal (disambiguation)
