= French ship Annibal =

Six ships of the French navy have borne the name Annibal in honour of Hannibal

== French ship named Annibal ==
- Annibal (1707), an unbuilt ship of the line (?)
- Annibal (1779–1794), a 74-gun ship of the line, lead ship of Annibal class
- Annibal (1782–1787), a captured British 52-gun ship
- Annibal (1795–1796), a gunboat
- Annibal (1801–1823), a captured British 74-gun ship of the line
- Prince Jérôme (1853–1886), a Hercule-class ship of the line was built as Annibal from 1827 and renamed Prince Jérôme on 24 May 1854
Ships of the French Navy named Annibal
Annibal as Achille (left) during the Glorious First of June

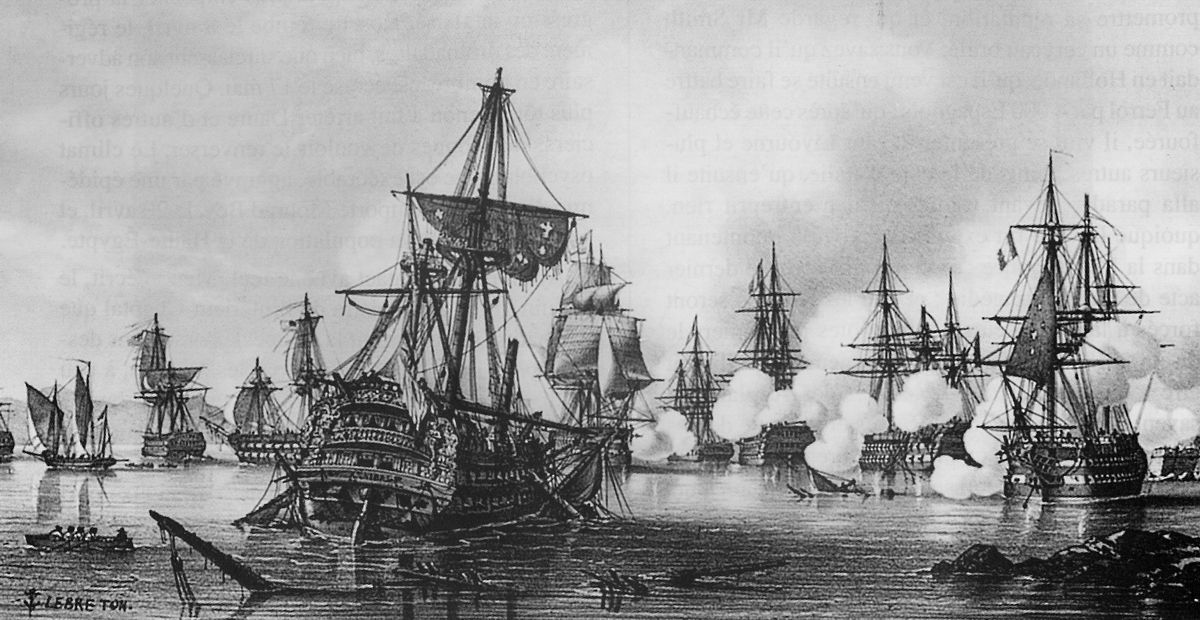
Capture of HMS Hannibal during the First Battle of Algeciras and before her recommissioning as Annibal in the French Navy.

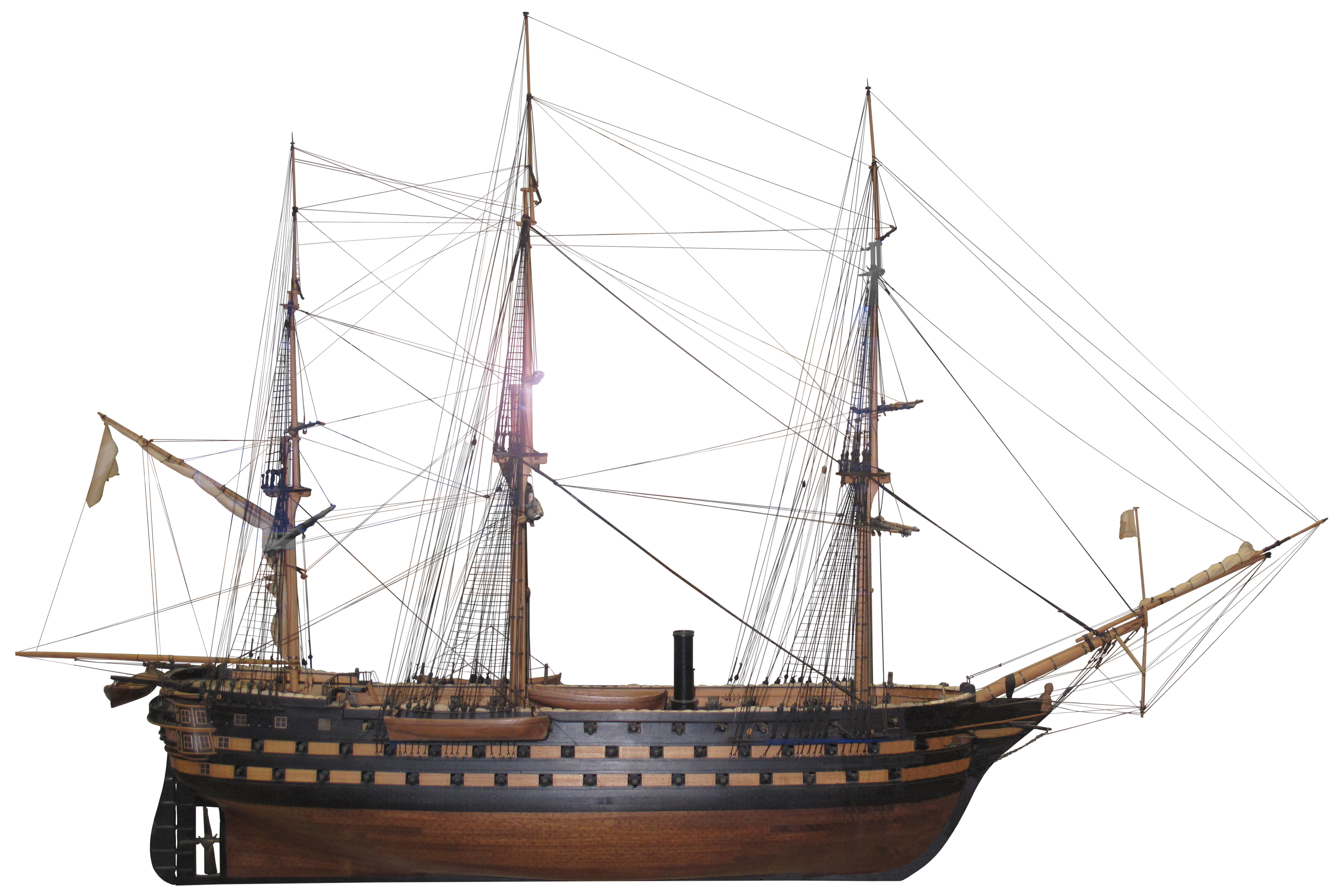
1/75th-scale model of Prince Jérôme, ex-Annibal, on display at the Swiss Museum of Transport.

== See also ==
- HMS Hannibal
- USS Hannibal

== Notes and references ==
=== Bibliography ===
- Roche, Jean-Michel (2005). Dictionnaire des bâtiments de la flotte de guerre française de Colbert à nos jours. Vol. 1. Group Retozel-Maury Millau. ISBN 978-2-9525917-0-6. OCLC 165892922.
- Roche, Jean-Michel (2005). Dictionnaire des bâtiments de la flotte de guerre française de Colbert à nos jours. Vol. 2. Group Retozel-Maury Millau. ISBN 978-2-9525917-0-6. OCLC 165892922.
