= Hired armed ship Hannibal =

Hannibal was an armed ship of 16 guns that the British Royal Navy hired in 1804. On 25 September she was reported to be escorting troop transports from Plymouth to the Downs. She was under the command of Commander Richard James Lawrence O'Connor on 16 November when she drifted from her anchors in the Downs; she was wrecked near Sandown Castle, Isle of Wight. Her crew was saved.
