= Hannibal (video game) =

1994 video game

Hannibal Master of the Beast
- Developer: Starbyte Software
- Publisher: MicroLeague
- Designer: Claude Cueni
- Platforms: Amiga, MS-DOS
- Release: 1994
- Genre: Strategy
- Mode: Single-player

Hannibal, often subtitled Master of the Beast, is a historically accurate war strategy game released in 1994 for the Amiga and MS-DOS. It was designed by Claude Cueni for Starbyte Software and published by MicroLeague and General Admission Software.

== Gameplay ==
Hannibal is a turn-based strategy game wherein you play the role of Carthaginian General Hannibal, commanding his armies in his struggle with Roman Empire during the Second Punic War. Managing the economy and military over a world map, you recruit armies (infantry, cavalry, war elephants, navy), siege cities, win battles, and expand Carthage's political influence from Africa to Europe to the Middle East.

== Reception ==
Computer Gaming World in April 1994 called Hannibal a "muddled simulation". The magazine stated that the "unbelievably detailed examination of the Second Punic War ... puts a lot of power in the user's hands, but the gamer is forced to wear so many hats that movement of troops is virtually impossible, much less combat". A longer review the next month stated that game play was "boring ... repetitious, tiresome and dull". It noted the length of the "one long scenario", criticized the too-short documentation and lack of tutorial, and reported that despite its detail the game did not correctly model the war elephant's effect on the battlefield. Concluding that "Hannibal Lecter would prove a more entertaining houseguest than Hannibal", the magazine concluded that "MicroLeague could learn a lot from" Sid Meier's emphasis on "fun".

German reviews were more favorable, with Amiga Joker and its sister magazine PC Joker each giving 78 out of 100 points, praising the graphics and "colourful history" offered by the game, PC Joker calling it the "most beautiful history strategical to date". It holds an average score of 72.0% for critic reviews at Moby Games.
