= Annibale Maggi =

Venetian architect

Annibale Maggi was a Venetian architect of the Renaissance period. He designed and helped build the loggia del Consiglio in Padua in 1493, and was the architect and the owner of the house of San Giovanni degli Specchi. Also known as Annibale Bassano or da Bassano.
