= Annibal Camoux =

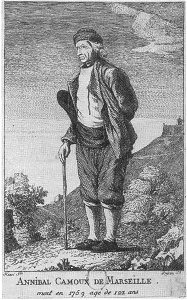
Annibal Camoux

Annibal Camoux (1638? – 1759) was a French soldier from Marseille, Provence, who was noted for his longevity. Most researchers, including French historian Louis Thibaux, consider this an unverified longevity claim.

A former soldier in the service of the King of France, according to his biography, Camoux reached age 100 without losing his strength, which he attributed to his practice of chewing Angelica root. He claimed to have gained his knowledge of herbs from the naturalist Joseph Pitton de Tournefort in 1681.

He enlisted in the French army aged 12 and said he took part in the construction Fort St Nicolas in 1660.

Louis XV allocated a pension to him. In 1755 the Cardinal Belloy, Bishop of Marseille, visited him. Several artists painted his portrait, among them Claude Joseph Vernet, who painted him in the port of Marseille.

Annibal Camoux died in 1759 in Marseille, at the claimed age of 121. Research, however, suggests he was born in 1669, meaning he was only 90 when he died.

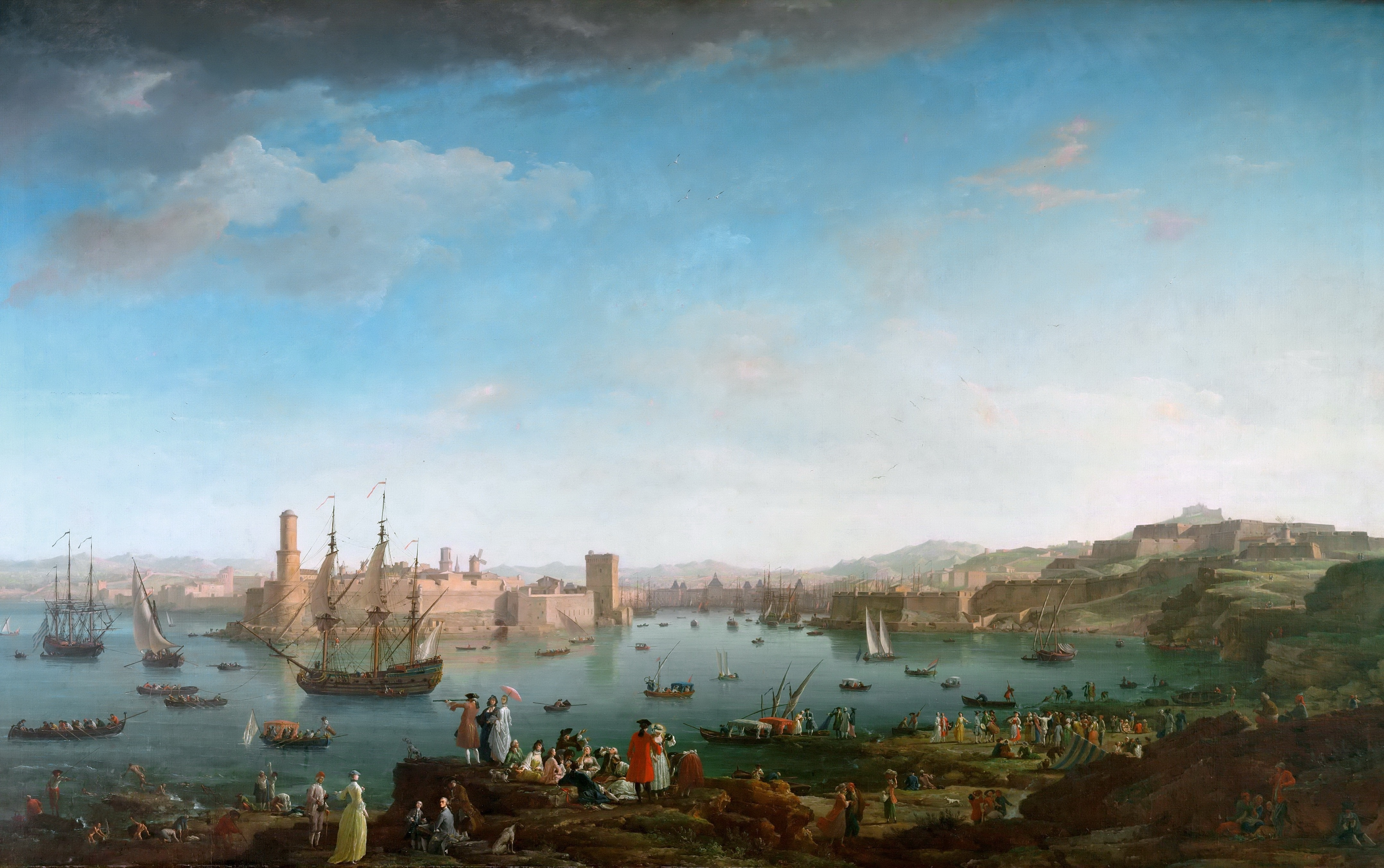
Claude Joseph Vernet, L'entrée du port de Marseille (1754), Louvre Museum

L'entrée du port de Marseille (1754) by Claude Joseph Vernet is part of a series of 15 representations of French sea ports commissioned by King Louis XV and realised between 1754 and 1765. The booklet of the 1755 art show gave some information: Entrance of Marseilles Harbour. We can see the Fort St. Jean and Citadelle Saint Nicolas which protects this entrance.... on the foreground, the author has painted a portrait of a man which is 117 years old with a good health.
