= Hannibal For King =

American calisthenic athlete (born 1978)

Hannibal Lanham
Personal information
- Nickname: Hannibal For King
- Born: February 4, 1978 (age 48) Queens, New York City, United States

Sport
- Sport: Street workout

Hannibal Tyrone Lanham (born February 4, 1978), nicknamed Hannibal For King, is an American calisthenic athlete and a pioneer of the practice of street workout.

== Biography ==
Hannibal Tyrone Lanham was born on February 4, 1978 in Queens, New York City. He is an African American. Lanham went through a difficult childhood; as his father was incarcerated, he was raised by his grandmother. By 2008, he was living in a homeless shelter, although his fortunes would turn when a video of him performing extraordinary feats of calisthenics in a park, titled "Hannibal For King," became viral. By 2014, the video had accumulated a total of 9,502,956 views; it was an emblematic moment of the history of street workout, and fueled the popularity of the activity. Following its publication, Lanham would make a "modest" income as a personal trainer, through DVD sales, and endorsement deals.
