= HMS Hannibal (1782) =

Sloop of the Royal Navy

History

United Kingdom
- Name: HMS Hannibal
- Builder: Perch
- Launched: 1782
- Fate: Foundered 1788

General characteristics
- Tons burthen: 220 tons
- Length: 94 ft (29 m)
- Beam: 25 ft (7.6 m)
- Propulsion: Sails
- Armament: 14 guns

HMS Hannibal was a 14 gun sloop built in 1782, the second ship to bear the name Hannibal. She foundered in 1788, after only six years in service.
