= Hannibal (network) =

Far-right militant network in German-speaking countries

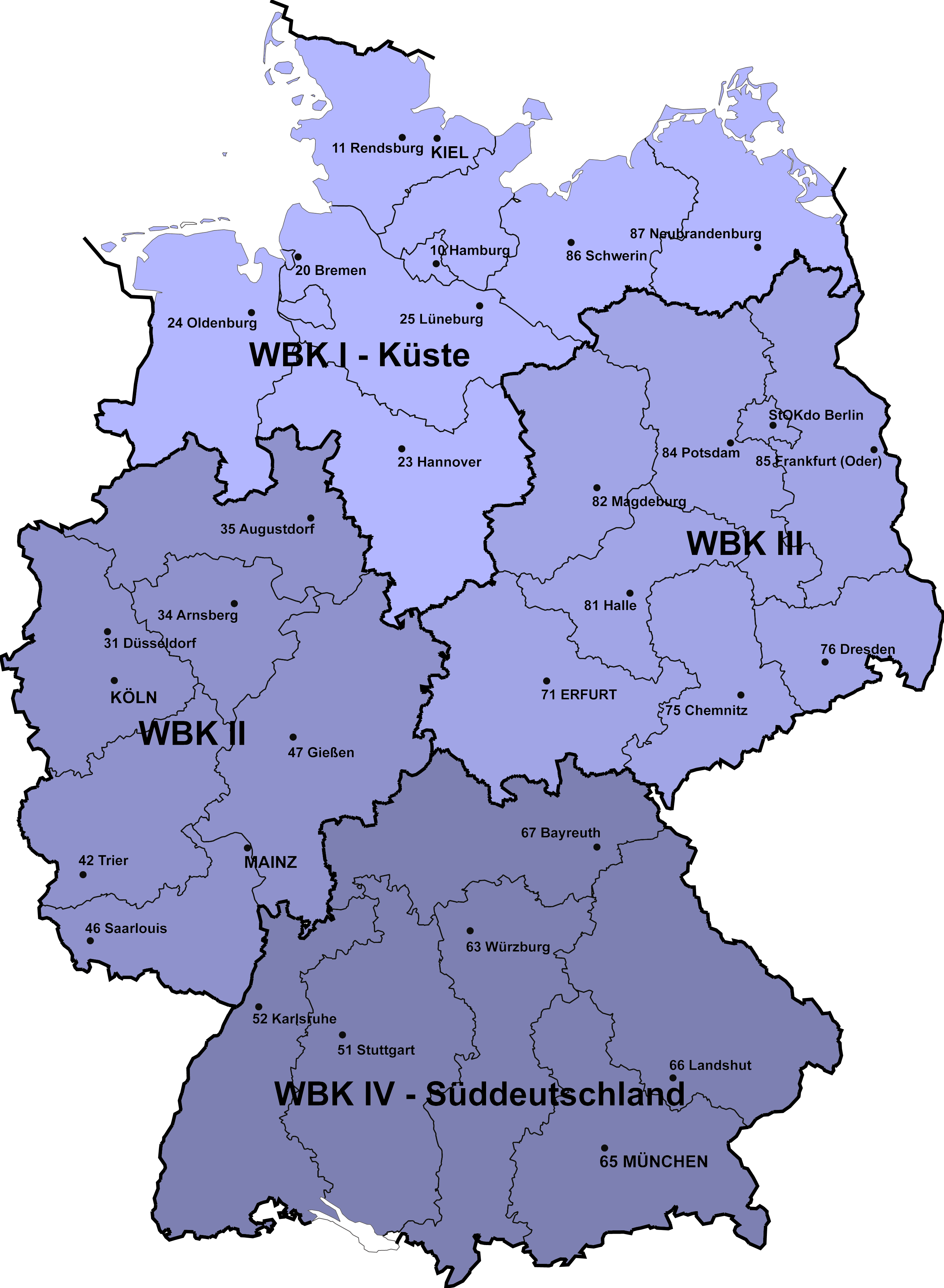
Areas of responsibility of the German military's Wehrbereichskommandos, which served as a model for the group's regional divisions

Hannibal was the name of a network of far-right prepper groups and individuals operating in Germany, Austria, and Switzerland, which coordinated via the chat service Telegram in anticipation of the government's collapse on what they dubbed "Tag X" ("Day X"). Founded in 2015, the network was subject to an investigation by German authorities in 2017, at which time its founder ordered the deletion of the chat groups. However, government investigations into members of groups affiliated with "Hannibal" are ongoing.

== History ==
The name stems from the online handle of André Schmitt, a non-commissioned officer in the Kommando Spezialkräfte, who founded, administered, and coordinated the network beginning in autumn 2015. Schmitt supplied the network with confidential information about Germany's security situation. Some of the groups linked to the Hannibal network developed concrete plans for violent actions on "Day X", preparing safe houses, stockpiling arms and ammunition, and compiling lists of political enemies. Among the participants were army reservists, police officers, judges, members of SEK police tactical units, and other German security authorities. The German news media likened the group to Organisation Consul and similar nationalist cells within the Reichswehr that plotted to overthrow the Weimar Republic during the 1920s and called Hannibal a "shadow army". Schmitt stated in 2016 that the network had around 2,000 members in total.

The chat network was subdivided into four regional groups in Germany, as well as one group each for Austria and Switzerland. The German regional groups followed the boundaries of the former German military district commands.

== Government investigation ==
The Federal Office for the Protection of the Constitution had knowledge of at least parts of the network by the end of 2016. Other German authorities started investigating "Hannibal" in 2017, in the course of an investigation into Franco Albrecht and the Day X plot. Albrecht, who is accused of having planned false flag attacks, had been a member of the network. Once Schmitt learned of the investigation, he immediately ordered the deletion of the chat groups. The investigations into the network have led to a number of police raids, including raids of places that Schmitt had mentioned as potential "safe houses" in the "Hannibal" chat groups. One of these raids uncovered explosives stashed in a cellar that belongs to Schmitt's parents. Schmitt was tried and sentenced to a fine of 1800 Euros.

As of July 2020, investigations into a number of members of groups affiliated with "Hannibal" were still ongoing.
