= Hannibal Monomachus =

Hannibal (Punic: 𐤇𐤍𐤁𐤏𐤋, ḤNBʿL), distinguished by Polybius as Hannibal Monomachus (Ancient Greek: Ἁννίβας Μονομάχος, Hanníbas Monomákhos), was a friend and staff officer of the great Carthaginian general Hannibal. His epithet means "One who Fights Alone" or "Gladiator". He is most famous for wrongly prophesying that during the march from Spain to Italy, the Carthaginians would likely run out of supplies and would need resort to cannibalism. In the end, this was unnecessary for Hannibal Barca's soldiers. The story of Hannibal Monomachus is given in book IX of Polybius' Histories.

== See also ==
- Other Hannibals in Carthaginian history
