= Heinrich Hannibal =

German SS commander (1899–1971)

- Born: 19 November 1889; German Empire
- Died: 9 May 1971 (aged 81); Hamburg, West Germany
- Military career
- Allegiance: Nazi Germany
- Branch: Waffen-SS
- Service years: 1914–1918; 1939–1945
- Rank: SS-Brigadeführer
- Conflicts: World War II
- Awards: Knight's Cross of the Iron Cross

Heinrich Hannibal (19 November 1889 – 9 May 1971) was an SS commander in the Orpo of Nazi Germany during World War II whose police units perpetrated mass murder in the occupied Soviet Union.

== Biography ==
At the start of World War II Hannibal was the commander of the police recruit Battalion 303 in Bremen. During this time he also joined the NSDAP and the SS. During Operation Barbarossa, the invasion of the Soviet Union in 1941, his battalion participated in the mass murder of Jewish civilians at Babi Yar in Kiev in September 1941. In January 1942, he took up the post of section officer of police in Kherson (Southern Russia) and in April 1943 the command of the SS-Polizei-Schützenregiments 31, which participated in so-called "anti-bandit" operations that involved murder and deportation of civilian population. He was awarded the Knight's Cross on 23 August 1944 for service with the Kampfgruppe Gottberg. He ended the war as a commander of a Kampfgruppe in the IV Army in East Prussia.

== Post-war activities ==
Hannibal was investigated in 1960s West Germany for the crimes committed by units under his command in the occupied Soviet Union. The investigation did not result in a criminal conviction. He died on 9 May 1971 in Hamburg.

== Notes ==
- Scherzer, Veit (2007). Ritterkreuzträger 1939 - 1945 Die Inhaber des Ritterkreuzes des Eisernen Kreuzes 1939 von Heer, Luftwaffe, Kriegsmarine, Waffen-SS, Volkssturm sowie mit Deutschland verbündeter Streitkräfte nach den Unterlagen des Bundesarchives. Scherzers Militaer-Verlag. ISBN 978-3-938845-17-2.
