= Day X plot =

Alleged German conspiracy in the 2010s

- Type: Ambush and assassination
- Planned by: Unknown Kommando Spezialkräfte (KSK) soldiers
- Target: Dietmar Bartsch and others
- Objective: Elimination of left-wing political leaders
- Date: Day X, an unspecified operational date
- Outcome: Potentially neutralized

The Day X plot refers to plans allegedly formulated in 2017 by elements within the Kommando Spezialkräfte (KSK; "Special Forces Command") of Germany's Bundeswehr to assassinate several left-leaning politicians including Dietmar Bartsch. Others have dismissed the allegations as a conspiracy theory, saying a more routine criminal matter was exaggerated in order to embarrass the ruling Christian Democratic Union of Germany in advance of the 2017 German federal election.

Information about the supposed plot came to police attention during the investigation of a different alleged plot by German military officers to assassinate the President of Germany. The planned killings were made public in November 2018. Two German military officers were arrested in relation to the alleged plot. One was tried and acquitted, and the other released on court order without charge. Franco Albrecht, a former lieutenant, was found guilty of planning terror attacks posing as a refugee and was sentenced to five and a half years in prison

== Background ==
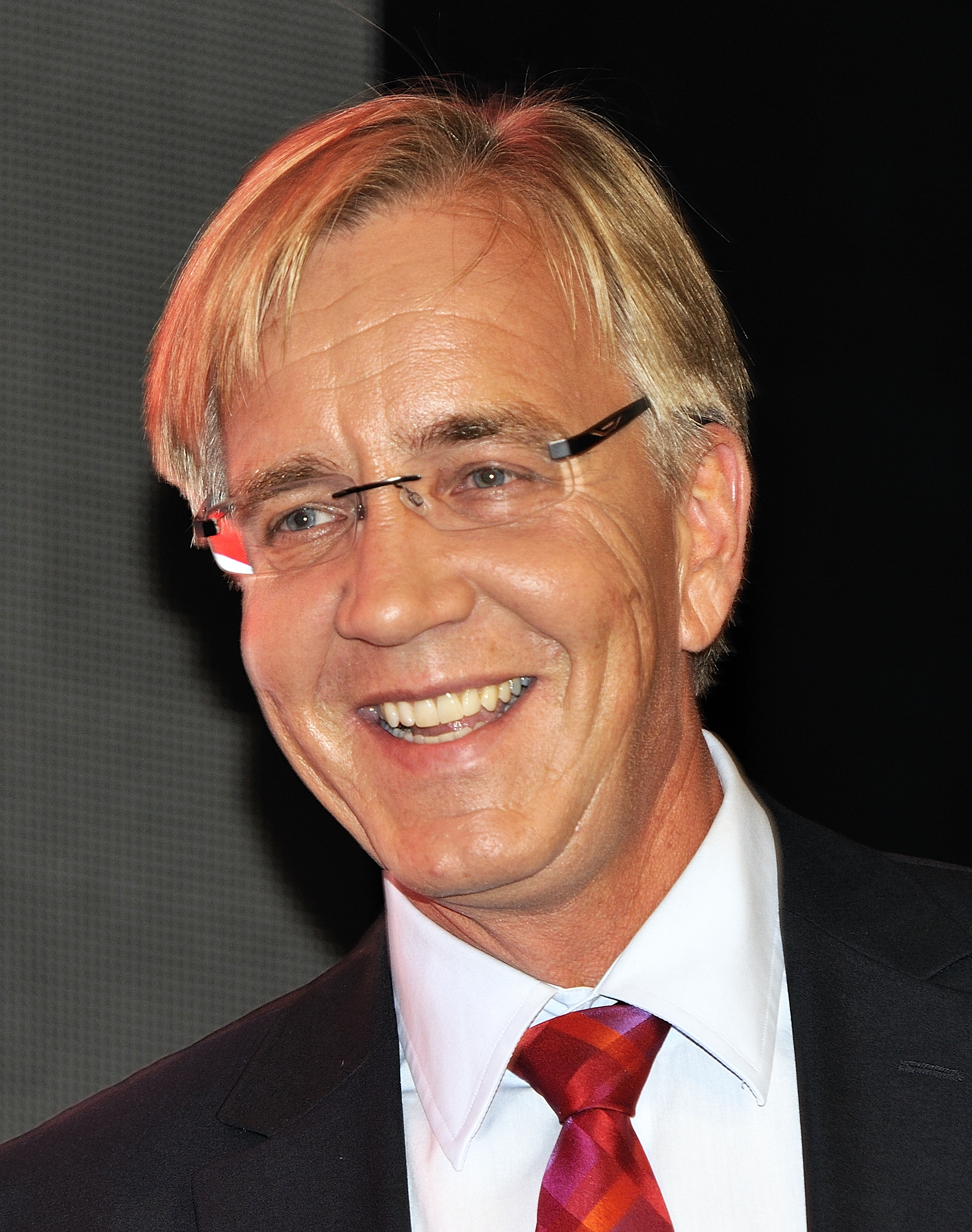
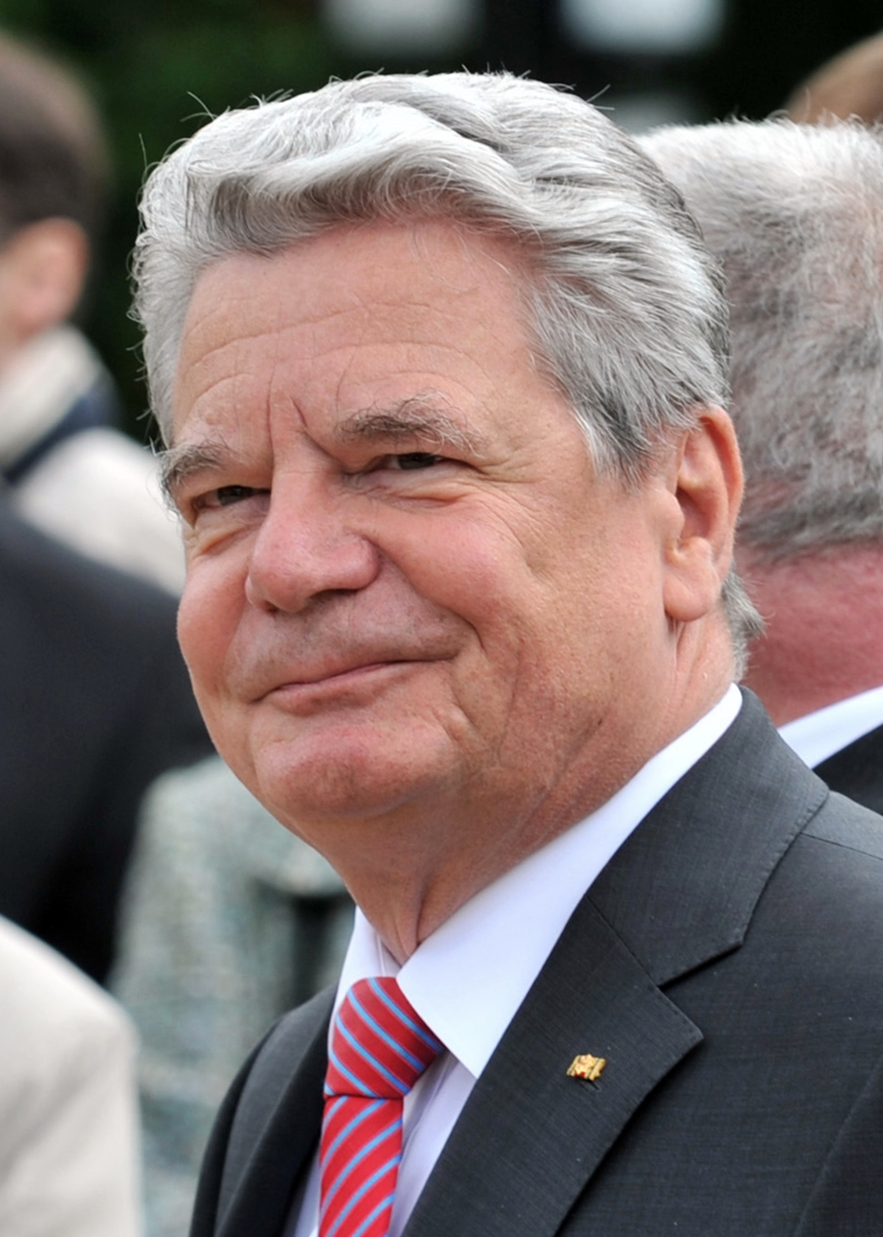
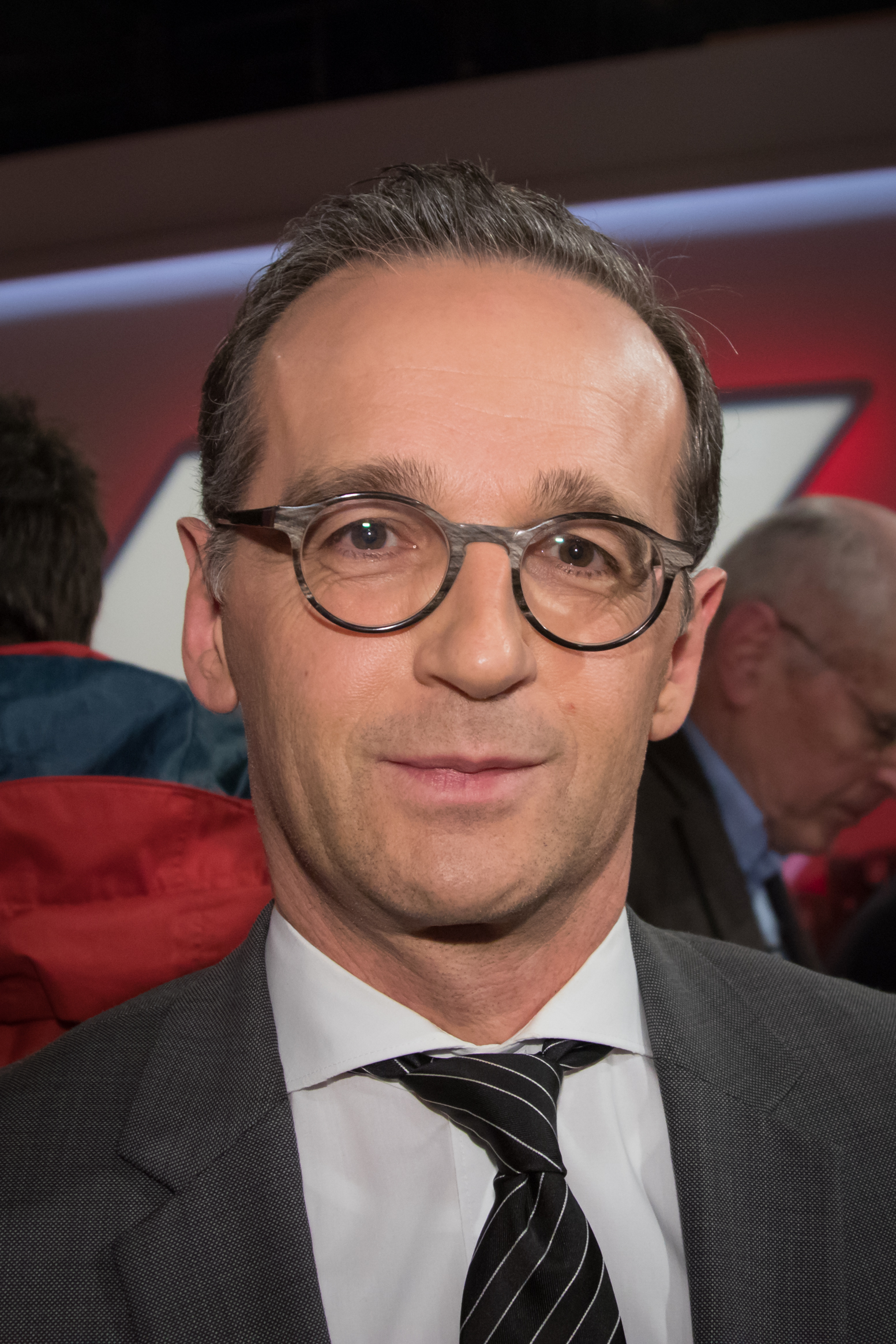
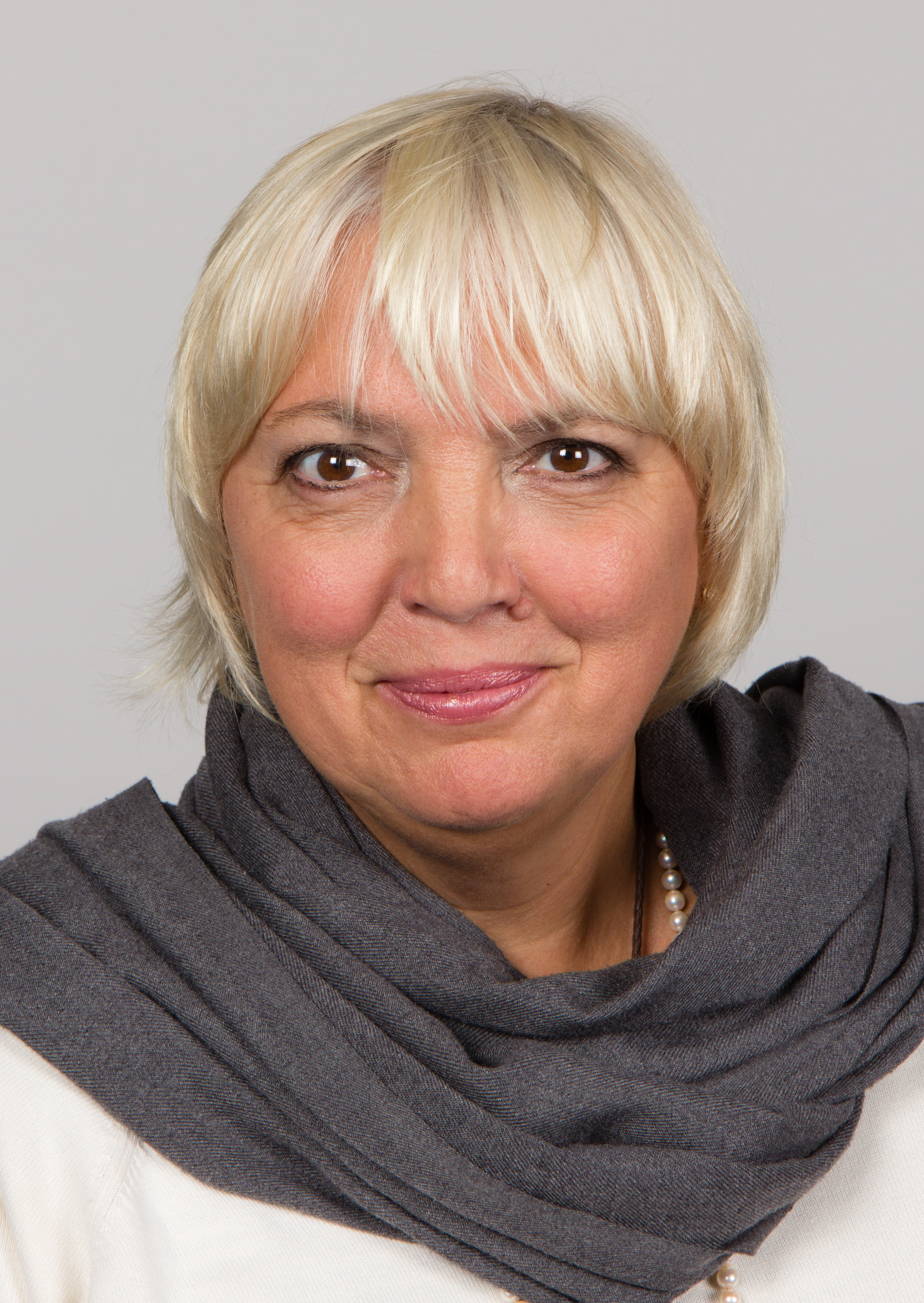
Dietmar Bartsch, Joachim Gauck, Heiko Maas, and Claudia Roth were among those named as potential assassination targets on Day X and during the earlier, "Franco A." conspiracy.

Between 2008 and 2017, Germany's Military Counter-intelligence Service (MAD) identified roughly 200 right-wing extremists within the Bundeswehr.

In April 2017, German prosecutors charged a 28-year-old German Army soldier and two others with plotting a wave of violent attacks against left-leaning German politicians that would be framed on asylum seekers. "Franco A.", a lieutenant, had planned to target President of Germany Joachim Gauck, Heiko Maas, Claudia Roth, and unnamed "human rights activists and journalists". He was purportedly aided by another soldier, named only as "Maxilimilian T." and a university student named as "Mathias F." According to authorities, a search of "Franco A."'s quarters also revealed his possession of Wehrmacht memorabilia and, it was also learned, his master's degree thesis advanced what was described as völkisch arguments and theories.

In November of that year, the Federal Court of Justice ordered "Franco A." released, ruling that "the results so far of the investigation do not substantiate the strong suspicion that a serious act threatening the state was in preparation".

In 2022 Franco A. was convicted of preparing a "serious act of violence endangering the state". He was also convicted of possessing illegal weapons and explosives and of fraud, according to the verdict.

== Alleged plot ==
In September 2017, prior to "Franco A."'s release, Federal Criminal Police officers searched the barracks of the German Army's elite Kommando Spezialkräfte (KSK) in Calw. The search occurred after information obtained in the investigation of "Franco A." indicated that "Franco A." might have had contact with KSK soldiers. Police were unable to find evidence of subversive activity during the search but suspected the KSK soldiers had been tipped off before their arrival.

On 9 November 2018, Focus first publicly reported on the investigation. According to it, the inquiry had uncovered a potential conspiracy within the KSK designed to murder Dietmar Bartsch and other unnamed politicians on an operational date designated Day X. Day X was not a date-specific point, rather it was an unknown future date that would be designated at an opportunistic weak point in government power in order to maximize instability and accelerate the collapse of state authority.

In addition to the Federal Criminal Police, Deutschlandfunk reported that the German domestic security agency, the Federal Office for the Protection of the Constitution, were also investigating the matter.

== Arrests and legal aftermath ==
According to authorities, the earlier alleged tip-off to potential KSK conspirators had been made by a lieutenant colonel in MAD who alerted the soldiers about the raid on their barracks in advance of it occurring. Police apparently learned of this due to an informant, "André S.", placed within the KSK. The MAD double agent, named in charging documents as "Peter W.", was subsequently indicted in a Cologne Amtsgericht on unspecified charges related to his alleged interference, police also alleging he was the previously unknown leader of Hannibal. "Peter W."'s defense in the case alleged that much of the plot had been exaggerated and dramatized by supporters of the Social Democratic Party of Germany within the Federal Ministry of Justice and Consumer Protection as a political scheme to embarrass the Christian Democratic Union of Germany in advance of the 2017 federal elections. He was acquitted of all charges and, as of 2020, continues to serve in the German armed forces.

In November 2019 the Federal Court of Justice (BGH) instructed the Higher Regional Court of Frankfurt to open a process against Franco Albrecht on a charge of "preparing a serious, state-damaging act of violence". In 2022, Albrecht was found guilty of planning terror attacks posing as a refugee and was sentenced to five and a half years in prison.

== See also ==
- 20 July plot – a 1944 attempted military coup in Germany
- Night of the Long Knives – a violent, 1934 political purge in Germany
- 2022 German coup d'état plot
- Strategy of tension
