= Hannibal (given name) =

Hannibal is a latinization (Ancient Greek: Ἀννίβας, Hanníbas) of the Carthaginian masculine given name ḥnbʿl (Punic: 𐤇𐤍𐤁𐤏𐤋), meaning "Baal is Gracious". Its continued use in later times and cultures ever since is caused mainly by the historical fame of the Carthaginian leader Hannibal, who commanded its forces during the Second Punic War.

"Hannibal" may refer to:

== Carthaginians ==
- Hannibal Mago (died 406 BC), shofet (magistrate) of Carthage in 410 BC
- Hannibal Gisco (died 258 BC), military commander in the First Punic War
- Hannibal the Rhodian, ship captain during the siege of Lilybaeum in the First Punic War
- Hannibal (Mercenary War) (died 238 BC), general during the Mercenary War
- Hannibal (247–183/182 BC), general who fought the Roman Republic in the Second Punic War
- Hannibal Monomachus, friend and staff officer of the Second Punic War general Hannibal

== Others ==
- Hannibal Buress (born 1983), American comedian from Chicago
- Hannibal Day (1804–1891), Union army officer during the American Civil War
- Hannibal Gaddafi, son of former Libyan leader Muammar Gaddafi
- Hannibal Hamlin (1809–1891), Abraham Lincoln's first vice president
- Hannibal Tyrone Lanham (born 1978), American calisthenic athlete
- Hannibal Kimball (1832–1895), American entrepreneur
- Hannibal Hawkins Macarthur (1788–1861), Australian colonist, politician, businessman and wool pioneer
- Hannibal Mejbri (born 2003), Tunisian footballer
- Hannibal Navies (born 1977), American National Football League player
- Hannibal Potter (1592–1664), English clergyman and President of Trinity College, Oxford
- Hannibal Price (1841–1893), Haitian diplomat and author
- Hannibal Sehested (council president) (1842–1924), Danish Council president
- Hannibal Sehested (governor) (1609–1666), Danish Governor of Norway
- Hannibal Valdimarsson (1903–1991), Icelandic politician

== Fiction ==
- Hannibal King, Nightstalker and Vampire Hunter in Blade Trinity and The Tomb of Dracula comics.
- Hannibal Lecter, cannibalistic serial killer and psychiatrist
- John "Hannibal" Smith, leader of the A-Team
- Hannibal Roy Bean, villain in Xiaolin Showdown

== See also ==
- Aníbal (name), Spanish/Portuguese equivalent
- Annibale (name), Italian equivalent
