= Annibale =

Annibale is the Italian masculine given name and surname equivalent to Hannibal.

In English, it may refer to:

== Given name ==
- Annibale Albani (1682–1751), Italian cardinal
- Annibale I Bentivoglio, (died 1445), ruler of Bologna
- Annibale II Bentivoglio (died 1540), lord of Bologna
- Annibale Bergonzoli (1884–1973), Italian lieutenant general
- Annibale Bugnini (c.1912–1982), Roman Catholic prelate
- Annibale Caccavello (1515–1595), Italian sculptor
- Annibale Caro (1507–1566), Italian poet
- Annibale Carracci (1560–1609), Italian painter
- Annibale Ciarniello (1900–2007), one of last surviving Italian First World War veterans
- Annibale de Gasparis (1819–1892), Italian astronomer
- Annibale della Genga (1760–1829), birth name of Pope Leo XII
- Annibale di Ceccano (c.1282–1350), Italian cardinal
- Annibale Fontana (1540–1587), Italian sculptor, medalist and crystal worker
- Annibale Maria di Francia (1851–1927), founder of the Congregation of the Rogationists and of the Daughters of Divine Zeal
- Annibale Frossi (1911–1999), footballer
- Annibale Gonzaga (1602–1668), Holy Roman Empire field marshal
- Annibale Maggi (fl. 1493), Italian architect
- Annibale Padovano (1527–1575), Italian composer and organist
- Annibale Riccò (1844–1919), Italian astronomer
- Annibale Santorre di Rossi de Pomarolo, Count of Santarosa (1783–1825), Italian insurgent and leader in the revival (Risorgimento) of Italy
- Annibale Stabile (c.1535–1595), Italian composer
- Annibale Zoilo (c.1537–1592), Italian composer and singer

== Surname ==
- Antonio Annibale (born 1940), Italian footballer
- Giuseppe d' Annibale (1815–1892), cardinal and theologian

== Other ==
- Annibale (film), 1959 Italian film

== See also ==
- Annibal (disambiguation)
- Aníbal (name), the Spanish version of the name
- Hannibal (disambiguation)
