= List of exercise activities =

List of physical exercise and training activities

This is a list of exercise activities and forms of physical training performed for fitness, conditioning, recreation, or sport participation.

== Endurance and cardiovascular activities ==
- Cycling
- Jogging or running
- Jump rope
- Rowing
- Stair climbing
- Walking

Laps or sidewalking

== Strength and resistance training ==
- Body building
- Calisthenics
- Olympic weightlifting
- Powerlifting
- Street workout
- Weight training

== Conditioning and training methods ==
- Circuit training
- CrossFit
- Fitness boot camp
- Functional training
- High-intensity interval training
- Plyometrics

== Flexibility and mind–body exercise ==
- Barre
- Feldenkrais Method
- Flexibility training
- Pilates
- Qigong
- Stretching
- Tai chi
- [yoga] or hot yoga

One leg balance

== Martial arts and combat training ==
- Brazilian jiu-jitsu
- Hand-to-hand combat
- Judo
- Karate
- Kickboxing
- Muay Thai
- Taekwondo
- Tricking (martial arts)
- Wrestling

== Gymnastics and movement disciplines ==
- Artistic gymnastics
- Freerunning
- Gymnastics
- Parkour
- Rhythmic gymnastics
- Slacklining
- Trampoline parks

== Dance-based fitness ==
- Aerobics
- Belly dance
- Jazzercise
- shuffle dance
- Step aerobics
- Zumba

Just dance

== Aquatic fitness ==
- Ai Chi
- Aqua cycling
- Aquajogging
- Bodyboarding
- Hydrogymnastics
- Jetboarding
- Logrolling
- Open water swimming
- Pedal boat
- Snorkeling
- Standup paddleboarding
- Surfing
- Swimming
- Synchronized swimming
- Water aerobics
- Water polo
- Water skiing, wakeboarding, and kneeboarding

== Team sports ==
- Baseball
- Basketball
- Handball
- Ice hockey
- soccer and indoor soccer
- Softball
- Ultimate frisbee
- Volleyball

Football

== Individual (solo) sports ==
- Archery
- Artistic swimming
- Bowling
- Darts
- Figure skating
- Golf
- Ice skating
- Rowing (single sculls)
- Skateboarding, downhill skateboarding, and longboarding
- Skiing (alpine, slalom, and cross-country)
- Snowboarding
- Speed skating and long-track speed skating

== One-on-one sports ==
- Badminton
- Boxing
- Mixed martial arts
- Paddle tennis
- Racquetball
- Table tennis
- Tennis

== Recreational and outdoor activities ==
- Adventure racing
- Backpacking (wilderness)
- BMX racing and freestyle BMX
- Bouldering
- Canoeing
- Decathlon
- Ironman Triathlon
- Dog scootering
- Freestyle scootering
- Hiking
- Kayaking
- Mountain biking
- Nordic walking
- Obstacle course racing
- Rafting
- Rock climbing
- Skateboarding
- Snowshoeing and snowshoe running
- Spartan Race
- Trail running
- Tough Mudder
- Roller skating or inline skating and artistic roller skating
- Wallball
- Wiffle ball

== See also ==
- Active mobility
- Physical fitness
- Exercise
- Exercise physiology
- List of children's games
- List of exercise equipment
- List of fitness apps
- List of health club chains
- Outline of exercise
- Sport
- YMCA
