= Hydrogymnastics =

Water-based therapeutic exercise

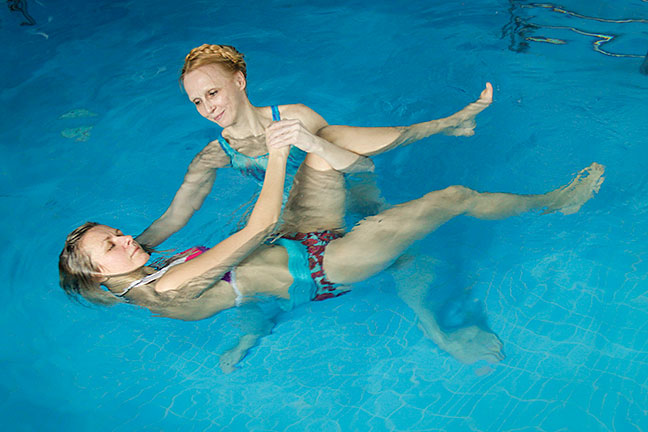
- An aquatic therapist and participant performing Watsu

Characteristics
- Mixed-sex: Yes
- Type: Aquatic
- Equipment: Resistance, floaties

Hydrogymnastics is a water-based therapeutic exercise. As its name suggests, this form of aquatic therapy or aquatic rehabilitation is performed in water, and it can take place in swimming pools at aquatic leisure centres and/or in home pools. Being a form of aquatic therapy, hydrogymnastics aims to improve the physical and psychological health and well-being of an individual. Hydrogymnastics can be performed by anyone, including youths (children, teenagers, young adults), middle-aged people, the elderly, athletes and those with disabilities. Hydrogymnastics is often assisted by a qualified aquatic therapist and/or exercise physiologist. Although the effects of hydrogymnastics may vary between individuals belonging to different age groups and genders, hydrogymnastics mainly improves one's cardiovascular fitness, strength, balance and mobility.

== History ==
Over time many different terms and names have been used to describe hydrogymnastics; however, all are categorised as a form of aquatic or water rehabilitation. The practice of water rehabilitation began in the 24th century BC in Ancient Greece and Asia, where people used the therapeutic benefits of water as both a remedy for illnesses and for religious reasons. However, hydrogymnastics (in a form less modern than today) began in the year 460 BC in Ancient Greece, where it simply involved a person transitioning between hot and cold water in order to treat diseases, muscle aches and pains and bring high fever temperatures down. This form of treatment continued over the years, but in the 6th century people's fear of water meant hydrogymnastics was not performed as often, and as a result bathing in general also declined. But in the 1700s, water and hydrogymnastics were used once again to treat illnesses; one of which was smallpox, which was a very common disease during this period of time.

As time passed, more and more people began to see the benefits of water rehabilitation, and as a result people all over the world adopted it into their lives. Consequently, new names, methods, techniques, styles, equipment and principles have been introduced into aquatic rehabilitation, one of which is hydrogymnastics. Today hydrogymnastics helps people of all ages and genders, including those with disabilities, to improve their balance, strength, endurance and movement. At the present time, almost every local aquatic centre has hydrogymnastics classes available.

Hydrogymnastics is also performed by athletes, who use hydrogymnastics as a form of recovery that can help them heal from injuries at a faster rate. Depending on the athlete and the sport, these injuries can range from serious back and shoulder injuries to hip and knee problems, including ligament tear or rupture. The severity of the injury will also determine whether the participants are assisted by the therapist, whether they use specific equipment and/or a form of resistance, how long they spend in the water, and the intensity of the activity. These are all also determined by the participant's pain levels.

== Techniques ==
=== Bad Ragaz Ring Method (BRRM) ===
One technique of hydrogymnastics is the Bad Ragaz Ring Method. In 1957, BRRM was created in the "therapeutic thermal pools of Bad Ragaz in Switzerland" by Dr. Knupfer. BRRM involves a participant and three ring floaties which are located around their neck, pelvis, keens and/or ankles. These floaties help the participant to stay afloat in a horizontal position. The therapist is located at the participants head, side or feet and hence is able to effectively perform movement (e.g. swaying, rocking, rolling, etc.). In order to be beneficial, this method requires warm water.

There are many benefits associated with BRRM; these include spinal alignment and elongation, stability, better range of joint motion, and ability to activate pre-weight bearing. People who would benefit from the Bad Ragaz Ring Method include those who suffer from pain while moving (e.g. walking, lifting, etc.), those who have poor range of motion and coordination, those who have "proprioceptive or sensory deficits", and those who are unable to use their full weight bearing. By using a particular form of equipment (floaties), BRRM is simultaneously a method for learning to activate different muscles and a form of body relaxation.

=== Watsu ===
Another hydrogymnastics technique is Watsu, which was created by Harold Dull in 1980 in the Hot Springs of Northern California. Essentially, Watsu combines both the Bad Ragaz Ring Method and Shiatsu massage – a type of massage that only uses hand pressure from a therapist. Like BRRM, this method should be performed in warm water in order to be completely beneficial.

In order for Watsu to work, the therapist should be situated at the centre of the participant's back, not so low that they are near their lumbar spine and not so high that they are near their cervical vertebrae. Watsu is heavily dependent on the therapist, as no floaties are used. By using the "supine position", the therapist literally holds or cradles the participant and glides them through the water. In Watsu it is extremely important that rhythmical breathing occur while the body is moving.

The benefits of Watsu include: reduced pain, freer range of motion and movement, more energy, development of even breathing, better sleeping and rest patterns, and a higher body awareness (the ability to feel when something in their body does not feel right). People who will benefit from Watsu include those who experience pain while moving, those who have suffered from a traumatic brain injury, and those who suffer from a neuromuscular disorder, soft tissue dysfunction, fatigue, hyperactivity, depression, stress, or anxiety.

=== Ai Chi ===
In 1990, Jun Knoon created another hydrogymnastics technique: Ai Chi, which incorporates both Tai chi and Qigong. Unlike the other methods, the participant who takes part in Ai Chi is alone and does not use any assistance from a therapist. The only commonality Ai Chi shares with the other methods is that it too is performed at shoulder level in warm water. To perform Ai Chi, the participant stands with their feet shoulder-width apart with their knees slightly bent (to prevent strain on their lower back). While they coordinate deep breaths and rhythmical inhaling and exhaling, they slowly move their body to stretch out muscles. By engaging their core/abdominal muscles to shift their body weight, the participant is able to lift their arms and legs to perform various stretches. The benefits of Ai Chi include: better flexibility and balance, improved range of motion and mobility, increased blood circulation, and higher energy levels. As a result, Ai Chi reduces one's stress, anxiety, fatigue, anger, and depression.

=== AquaStretch ===
AquaStretch is the most recent hydrogymnastics technique, developed and introduced in 2010 by George Eversaul. It involves resistance (e.g. wearing weights) in order to restore one's range of motion. Like the other techniques, AquaStretch takes place in warm water. In order to perform it, it is essential that both the therapist and participant abide by the "basic procedure", which incorporates four steps. The first step is "play", meaning that the participant freely moves around in water to find the exact location where they are experiencing pain. They then "freeze" when they have found the spot where they have pain and/or are prevented from moving. The therapist then applies pressure (with fingers, hand and/or elbow) to the muscle where the participant is experiencing the pain. The final step is "move"; this step, however, is not always performed. Depending on the participant and if "they feel the need to move", this step aims to release muscle or body tension.

The benefits of AquaStretch include decreased pain or soreness and improved flexibility, which suggests that the people most likely to benefit from AquaStretch are those who suffer from aches, pains, and muscle strains. It is also important for the therapist to shed light on the differences between "good" and "bad" pains; if the participant is experiencing "bad" or sharp pains, they must stop immediately.

== Health benefits ==
There are many health benefits associated with hydrogymnastics; these benefits are evidently found in a variety of people who suffer from physical health issues (e.g. arthritis, muscle pain, etc.), mental health issues (e.g. depression, low self-esteem, anxiety, etc.), injuries (e.g. ligament tears), and disabilities (e.g. cerebral palsy, Parkinson's disease, etc.). However, the overall benefits of hydrogymnastics on the participant/patient include: better coordination, balance and strength; improved endurance (muscular and cardiovascular); better range of joint and muscle motion; ability to manage pain; increased hydro-static pressure; and improved motor skills and locomotion skills. It is also important to note that hydrogymnastics has benefits also on the therapist, as the water buoyancy gives the participant a lighter body weight, thus allowing the therapist to lift, hold, and move the participant more easily.

Buoyancy indeed plays a large role in ensuring the participant's benefits from performing hydrogymnastics. When one is "submerged" in water, one's body will float, mainly due to the fact that water has an anti-gravitational effect. In hydrogymnastics, the deeper a person is immersed in water, the less body weight they are carrying, with this resulting in less pressure on one's joints, ligaments, bones and muscles; better flexibility; and increased range of motion. Because resistance activities are also incorporated into hydrogymnastics, this means that the participant will experience other health benefits such as muscle toning (especially around the legs, buttocks and arms) and reduced swelling (e.g. around the lower legs and feet).

=== Benefits on the elderly ===
When elderly people participate in hydrogymnastics, they gain the ability to move their body freely without the fear or risk of severely injuring themselves. This fear derives from their being prone to falling over because their weak, frail and fragile bodies simply cannot bear their body weight. In addition, hydrogymnastics will benefit the elderly because it is a way for them to keep active, move their body, stay physically healthy, and interact with others, which will ultimately benefit their mental, emotional and social well-being.

=== Benefits on the middle-aged ===
As one enters the middle-aged stage of life, it is common for one to lose strength and, as a result, be prone to injuries. By performing hydrogymnastics during this age period, one obtains benefits that can include improved upper/lower body strength, and endurance. One of the most beneficial hydrogymnastics activities would be "large muscle activities" such as walking in water, as this explicitly uses arm and leg movements and will increase the participant's muscular strength, endurance, and range of motion.

=== Benefits on youths ===
In regards to the youth age group, hydrogymnastics is mainly used to help support children or young adults who have disabilities or developmental delays. To positively affect children's functional mobility without causing excessive fatigue, therapists lead and assist activities such as floating, walking, resistance activities (e.g. using weights), sitting on floating mats, and performing in different water heights and water currents. Consequently, this increases their functional mobility. Doing hydrogymnastics in a group or with other participants also improves their socialisation skills, as interacting with others encourages them to engage with people belonging to their environment, a key characteristic necessary for individuals to function within society. Having an improved functional mobility has important implications on the overall health and development of young children with disabilities. This has the power to promote participation in other physical activities, which will improve their mental, physical, emotional, and spiritual well-being.

=== Benefits on athletes ===
Hydrogymnastics can also be performed by any level of athlete, including: professionals (Olympians, world champions, etc.), elite athletes, and international, national, state, and local stream athletes. To these athletes, hydrogymnastics is a different way of training; moving in water means they are carrying a lighter body weight and are therefore not putting extra strain on their bodies, muscles, bones, and joints. If they are recovering from an injury or going through their recovery, building back their strength and endurance in water is a very effective method and can potentially result in their returning to their land-based sport more speedily. Applying motor skills in water can potentially increase the participant's confidence, because in water they can do things they are unable to do on land.

== Health risks ==
There are not many health risks associated with hydrogymnastics; however, it is important for therapists and participants to take precautions in order to prevent injuries or internal damage, regardless of age or ability level. These precautions include: being aware of potential ear infections (considering hydrogymnastics is performed in water) and understanding that overuse can cause muscle strains, aches, cramps, soreness, and even tears. If a severe injury such as a broken bone, soft tissue or fracture exists, it is strongly recommended that the participant not perform hydrogymnastics until the injury has sufficiently healed or until the therapist advises to do so.
