= Dirty dog exercise =

Hip exercise

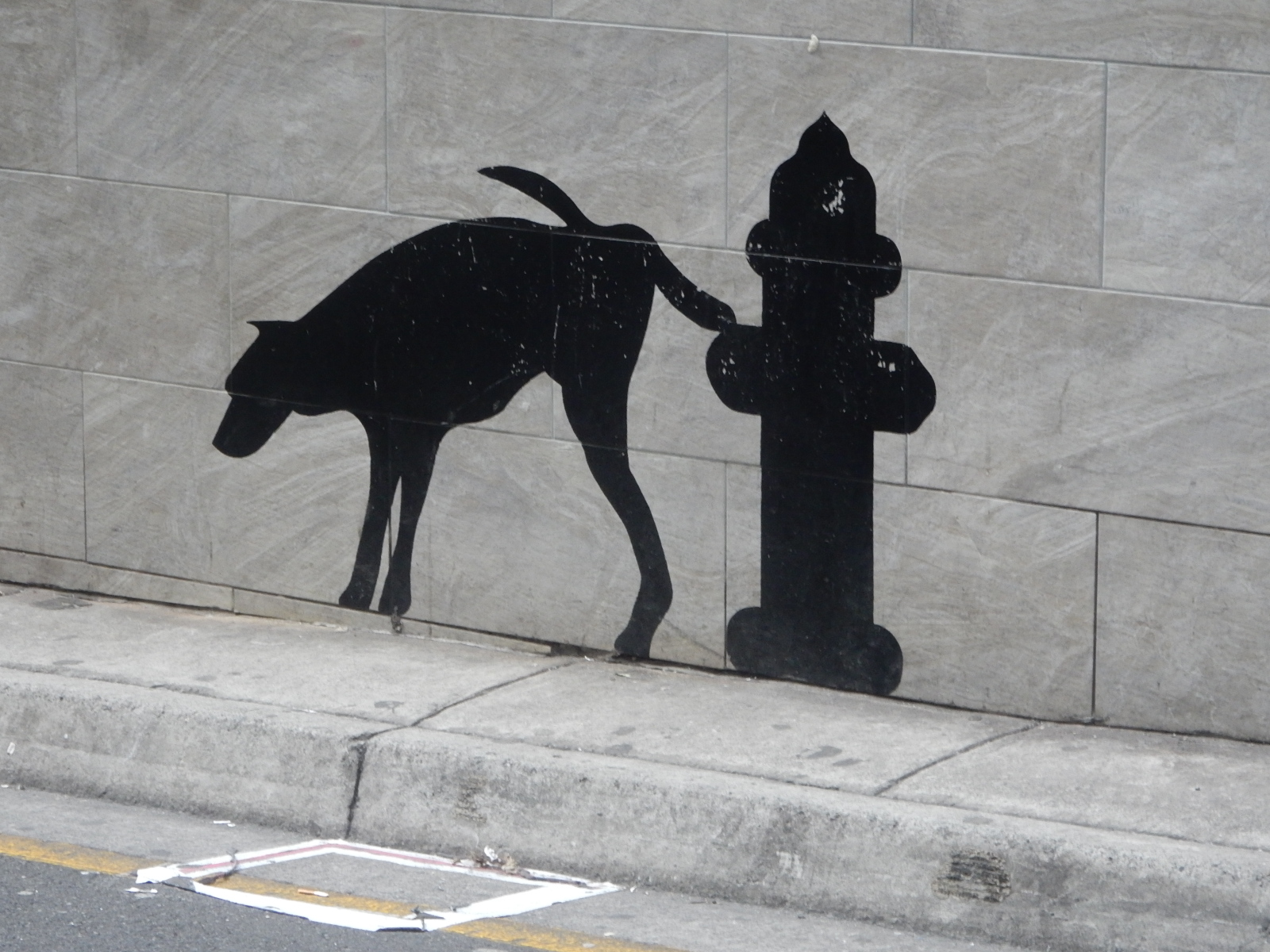
Silhouette example of the namesake.

Dirty dog exercise or hip side lifts or fire hydrant exercise is an exercise that is meant to strengthen the hips and buttocks, without the use of weights. It is so named due to its resemblance to the way a dog urinates. The exercise also improves core stability.
