= Halliwick =

The Halliwick Concept focuses on biophysical principles of motor control in water, in particular developing sense of balance (equilibrioception) and core stability. The Halliwick Concept recognises the benefits that can be derived from activities in water, and sets out the fundamentals necessary for teaching and learning in this environment. The Halliwick Ten-Point-Programme implements the concept in a progressive programme of mental adjustment, disengagement, and development of motor control, with an emphasis on rotational control, and applies the programme to teach physically disabled people balance control, swimming, and independence. Halliwick Aquatic Therapy (also known as Water Specific Therapy, WST), implements the concept in patient-specific aquatic therapy for application in rehabilitation of injury and disability.

== The Halliwick Concept ==
The Halliwick Concept was originally developed by fluid mechanics engineer James McMillan in the late 1940s and 1950s, at the Halliwick School for Girls with Disabilities in London, to teach physically disabled people independence in water. Based on fluid mechanics, McMillan developed teaching and therapeutic approaches to enhance sense of balance (equilibrioception) and core stability.

According to the Halliwick Concept, physical properties of water form the basis for therapeutic intervention:

- Turbulence, Flow, and Resistance: Turbulent moving water provides resistance; therefore balance is lost slowly and there is time to react and learn motor control.
- Buoyancy: Buoyancy provides an easy way to change position, which influences the vestibular system in sensory integration.
- Buoyancy, Gravity, and Rotational Torques: Buoyancy forces counteract gravity forces and create rotational torques (metacentric effects). These torques can be used to increase load on connective tissue.

The first part of the concept, the Halliwick Ten-Point-Programme, incorporates these biophysical principles and focuses on mental adjustment, disengagement, and development of motor control, with an emphasis on rotational control, and is applied to teach participation in water activities, moving independently in water, and swimming. McMillan emphasized participation and independence: the willingness to lose balance and knowing how to stand up again.

The second part of the concept, Halliwick Aquatic Therapy (also known as Water Specific Therapy, WST), applies the fundamental biophysical principles and the underlying principles of the Ten-Point-Programme for planning and implementing patient-specific aquatic therapy.

== Technique ==
=== The Halliwick Ten-Point-Programme ===
The first part of the Halliwick Concept implements the Halliwick Ten-Point-Programme to develop balance control, swimming skills, and independence:

1. Mental Adjustment: is an ongoing process throughout the learning process. Swimmer has to learn to respond appropriately to the water environment (adjusting turbulence and buoyancy, learning breath control, cultivating confidence and good attitude).
2. Disengagement: the swimmer becomes physically and mentally independent (reducing reliance on instructor, changing instructors, practicing independently).
3. Transversal Rotation Control: learning movement in the sagittal plane around a transverse axis, in particular, regaining the upright position from the horizontal position, and the horizontal position from the upright position; eventually learning somersaulting.
4. Sagittal Rotation Control: learning movement in the transverse plane around a sagittal axis, controlling activities that involve trunk side flexion, such as side stepping.
5. Longitudinal Rotation Control: learning movement around a longitudinal axis, controlling activities that involve rolling over.
6. Combined Rotation Control: learning to control any combination of rotations executed in a single movement; once learned a swimmer can control position in pool and is safe.
7. Upthrust or Mental Inversion: learning about buoyancy, in particular that water always pushes up (ex. picking up objects off the pool floor and feeling the upthrust bringing you back to the surface).
8. Balance in Stillness: learning to maintain a relaxed body while floating and with turbulence in different position.
9. Turbulent Gliding: learning to control the position of the body in a horizontal float position while being moved by the instructor.
10. Simple Progression and Basic Swimming Movement: progressing from simple propulsive movements to coordinated arm, leg, head, and torso movements required for swimming.

=== Halliwick Aquatic Therapy ===
The second part of the Halliwick Concept, known as Halliwick Aquatic Therapy (also called Water Specific Therapy, WST) is an aquatic therapy approach developed in Bad Ragaz, Switzerland since 1974. Halliwick Aquatic Therapy is a system-oriented aquatic motor (re)learning approach, which includes elements of the Ten-Point-Programme. It uses a holistic task-directed approach within the context of the International Classification of Functioning, Disability and Health (ICF), in particular postural control, normalizing muscle stiffness, and facilitation of movement to attain functional goals on land. It also follows training guidelines of physiology and its clinical reasoning in various patient populations. Most Halliwick therapy is active (dynamic) to facilitate movement and sensory input. Halliwick also has a passive (static) component, in which, for example involving selective activation of muscles and stabilization of specific joints by the therapist. Halliwick Aquatic Therapy is a problem-solving approach, in that specific possibilities and constraints of the client are analyzed in order to plan a systematic intervention to help the client gain functional increases.

== Applications ==
The Halliwick Ten-Point-Programme has been applied for teaching swimming to people with disability, as well as more broadly as a general approach to teaching swimming and working with disability.

Halliwick Aquatic Therapy has mainly used in neurorehabilitation and pediatrics. It has resemblances to Bobath and Conductive education. In neurological and paediatric rehabilitation, clients can experience early mobility. The mechanical advantages of water support the abilities of the trunk in a mobilising and stabilising way. In this sense Halliwick is a constraint-induced movement therapy without the disadvantage of gravity compensation. Many activities easily can be repeated and varied and clients can learn balance- and stumble- strategies, which have carry-over effects to dry land. This application in fall prevention is extended by using obstacle courses or Ai Chi.

Halliwick also enables a graded activity programme: with low mechanical impact and increasing physiological demand, chronic low back pain patients and others can increase their functional capacity in a mostly joyful way.
