= Waterdance =

Type of aquatic therapy

WaterDance or Wata (abbreviation from the German WasserTanzen) is a type of aquatic therapy which was developed in Switzerland independently of Watsu. While wearing nose clips, a person is gently guided underwater, pulled, swayed, and "flown" while being regularly brought to the surface for breath.

== Overview ==
WaterDance (also known as Wasser Tanzen or WATA), developed by Arjana Brunschwiler and Aman Schroter in the 1980s, has been called "an underwater three-dimensional journey where time and space lose their meaning". WaterDance emphasizes gentle flowing movement underwater. After being stretched and relaxed at the surface, the receiver is given a noseclip, to prevent water from entering the nasal passages, and then gradually guided entirely underwater. Touch or movement signals are used to communicate when the receiver is to be submerged, and the therapist carefully times submersion to ensure the receiver has a full breath. Movement is coordinated with breath and incorporates elements of massage, Aikido, dolphin and snake-like waves, rolls, somersaults, inversions, and dance.

== Applications ==
- Relaxation
- Physical Rehabilitation

== See also ==
- Massage (Watsu)
- Healing Dance
