= Aquatic therapy =

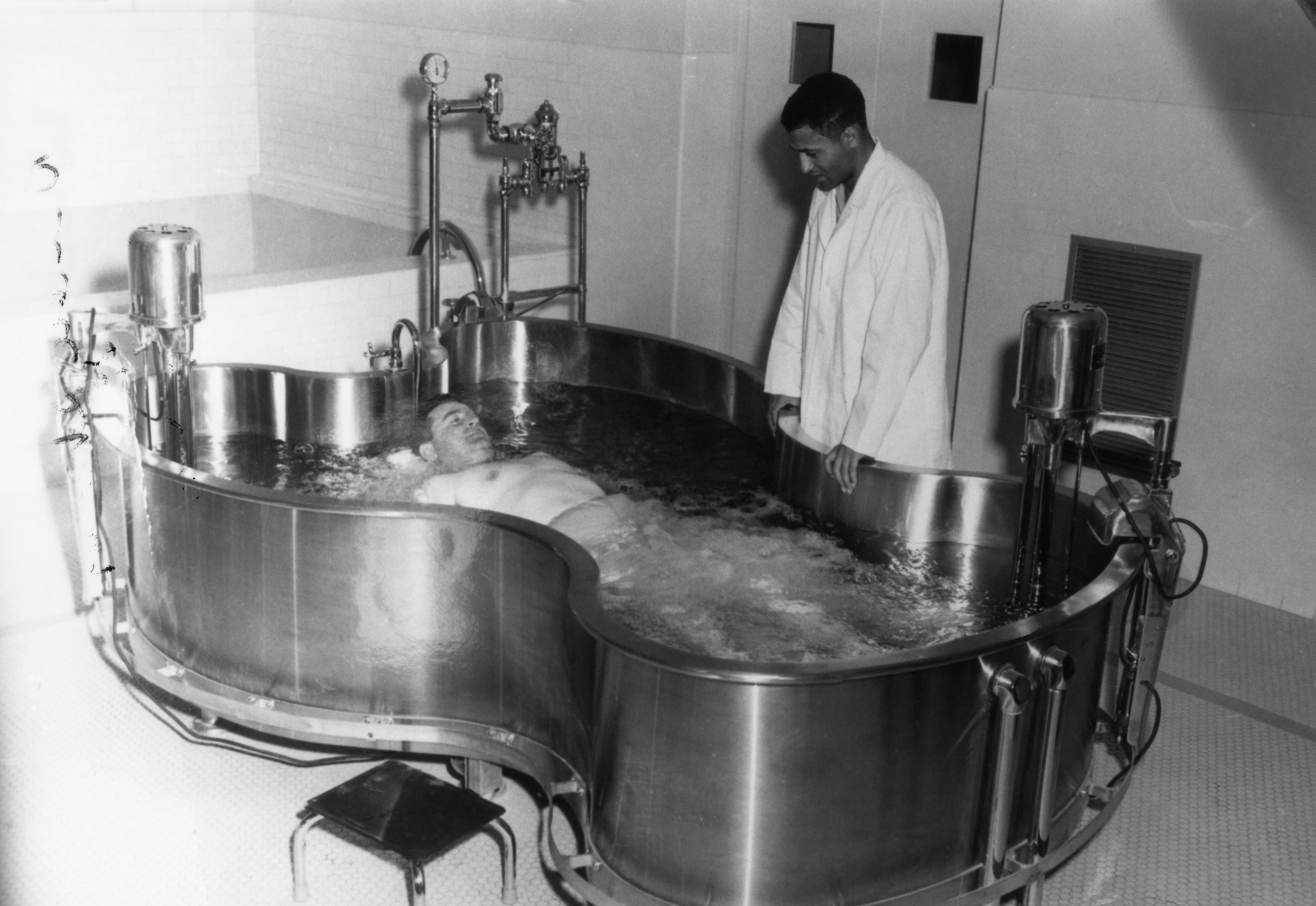
- Hubbard tank
- Specialty: Physical therapy

Aquatic therapy refers to treatments and exercises performed in water for relaxation, fitness, physical rehabilitation, and other therapeutic benefit. Typically a qualified aquatic therapist gives constant attendance to a person receiving treatment in a heated therapy pool. Aquatic therapy techniques include Ai Chi, Aqua Running, Bad Ragaz Ring Method, Burdenko Method, Halliwick, Watsu, and other aquatic bodywork forms. Therapeutic applications include neurological disorders, spine pain, musculoskeletal pain, postoperative orthopedic rehabilitation, pediatric disabilities, pressure ulcers, and disease conditions, such as osteoporosis. Aquatic physical therapy is also beneficial for older adults for fall prevention, increasing balance, and gait training.

== Overview ==
Aquatic therapy refers to water-based treatments or exercises of therapeutic intent, in particular for relaxation, fitness, and physical rehabilitation. Treatments and exercises are performed while floating, partially submerged, or fully submerged in water. Many aquatic therapy procedures require constant attendance by a trained therapist, and are performed in a specialized temperature-controlled pool. Rehabilitation commonly focuses on improving the physical function associated with illness, injury, or disability.

Aquatic therapy encompasses a broad set of approaches and techniques, including aquatic exercise, physical therapy, aquatic bodywork, and other movement-based therapy in water (hydrokinesiotherapy). Treatment may be passive, involving a therapist or giver and a patient or receiver, or active, involving self-generated body positions, movement, or exercise. Examples include Halliwick Aquatic Therapy, Bad Ragaz Ring Method, Watsu, and Ai chi.

For orthopedic rehabilitation, aquatic therapy is considered to be synonymous with therapeutic aquatic exercise, aqua therapy, aquatic rehabilitation, water therapy, and pool therapy. Aquatic therapy can support restoration of function for many areas of orthopedics, including sports medicine, work conditioning, joint arthroplasty, and back rehabilitation programs. A strong aquatic component is especially beneficial for therapy programs where limited or non-weight bearing is desirable and where normal functioning is limited by inflammation, pain, guarding, muscle spasm, and limited range of motion (ROM). Water provides a controllable environment for reeducation of weak muscles and skill development for neurological and neuromuscular impairment, acute orthopedic or neuromuscular injury, rheumatological disease, or recovery from recent surgery.

Various properties of water contribute to therapeutic effects, including the ability to use water for resistance in place of gravity or weights; thermal stability that permits maintenance of near-constant temperature; hydrostatic pressure that supports and stabilizes, and that influences heart and lung function; buoyancy that permits flotation and reduces the effects of gravity; and turbulence and wave propagation that allow gentle manipulation and movement.

== History ==
The use of water for therapeutic purposes first dates back to 2400 B.C. in the form of hydrotherapy, with records suggesting that ancient Egyptian, Assyrian, and Mohammedan cultures utilized mineral waters which were thought to have curative properties through the 18th century.

In 1911, Dr. Charles Leroy Lowman began to use therapeutic tubs to treat cerebral palsy and spastic patients in California at Orthopedic Hospital in Los Angeles. Lowman was inspired after a visit to Spaulding School for Crippled Children in Chicago, where wooden exercise tanks were used by paralyzed patients. The invention of the Hubbard Tank, developed by Leroy Hubbard, launched the evolution of modern aquatic therapy and the development of modern techniques including the Halliwick Concept and the Bad Ragaz Ring Method (BRRM). Throughout the 1930s, research and literature on aquatic exercise, pool treatment, and spa therapy began to appear in professional journals. Dr. Charles Leroy Lowman's Technique of Underwater Gymnastics: A Study in Practical Application, published in 1937, introduced underwater exercises that were used to help restore muscle function lost by bodily deformities. The National Foundation for Infantile Paralysis began utilizing corrective swimming pools and Lowman's techniques for treatment of poliomyelitis in the 1950s.

The American Physical Therapy Association (APTA) recognized the aquatic therapy section within the APTA in 1992, after a vote within the House of Delegates of the APTA in Denver, CO after lobbying efforts spearheaded starting in 1989 by Judy Cirullo and Richard C. Ruoti.

== Techniques ==
Techniques for aquatic therapy include the following:

- Ai Chi: Ai Chi, developed in 1993 by Jun Konno, uses diaphragmatic breathing and active progressive resistance training in water to relax and strengthen the body, based on elements of qigong and tai chi.
- Aqua running: Aqua running (Deep Water Running or Aquajogging) is a form of cardiovascular conditioning, involving running or jogging in water, useful for injured athletes and those who desire a low-impact aerobic workout. Aqua running is performed in deep water using a floatation device (vest or belt) to support the head above water.
- Bad Ragaz Ring Method: The Bad Ragaz Ring Method (BRRM) focuses on rehabilitation of neuromuscular function using patterns of therapist-assisted exercise performed while the patient lies horizontal in water, with support provided by rings or floats around the neck, arms, pelvis, and knees. BRRM is an aquatic version of Proprioceptive Neuromuscular Facilitation (PNF) developed by physiotherapists at Bad Ragaz, Switzerland, as a synthesis of aquatic exercises designed by a German physician in the 1930s and land-based PNF developed by American physiotherapists in the 1950s and 1960s.
- Burdenko Method: The Burdenko Method, originally developed by Soviet professor of sports medicine Igor Burdenko, is an integrated land-water therapy approach that develops balance, coordination, flexibility, endurance, speed, and strength using the same methods as professional athletes. The water-based therapy uses buoyant equipment to challenge the center of buoyancy in vertical positions, exercising with movement in multiple directions, and at multiple speeds ranging from slow to fast.
- Halliwick Concept: The Halliwick Concept, originally developed by fluid mechanics engineer James McMillan in the late 1940s and 1950s at the Halliwick School for Girls with Disabilities in London, focuses on biophysical principles of motor control in water, in particular developing sense of balance (equilibrioception) and core stability. The Halliwick Ten-Point-Program implements the concept in a progressive program of mental adjustment, disengagement, and development of motor control, with an emphasis on rotational control, and applies the program to teach physically disabled people balance control, swimming, and independence. Halliwick Aquatic Therapy (also known as Water Specific Therapy, WST), implements the concept in patient-specific aquatic therapy.
- Watsu: Watsu is a form of aquatic bodywork, originally developed in the early 1980s by Harold Dull at Harbin Hot Springs, California, in which an aquatic therapist continuously supports and guides the person receiving treatment through a series of flowing movements and stretches that induce deep relaxation and provide therapeutic benefit. In the late 1980s and early 1990s physiotherapists began to use Watsu for a wide range of orthopedic and neurologic conditions, and to adapt the techniques for use with injury and disability.

== Applications and effectiveness ==
Applications of aquatic therapy include neurological disorders, spine pain, musculoskeletal pain, postoperative orthopedic rehabilitation, pediatric disabilities, pressure ulcers, and other disease conditions, such as osteoporosis.

A 2006 systematic review of effects of aquatic interventions in children with neuromotor impairments found "substantial lack of evidence-based research evaluating the specific effects of aquatic interventions in this population".

For musculoskeletal rehabilitation, aquatic therapy is typically used to treat acute injuries as well as subjective pain of chronic conditions, such as arthritis. Water immersion has compressive effects and reflexively regulates blood vessel tone. Muscle blood flow increases by about 225% during immersion, as increased cardiac output is distributed to skin and muscle tissue. Flotation is able to counteract the effects of gravitational force on joints, creating a low impact environment for joints to perform within. The temperature changes, increase in systolic blood pressure to extremities, and overall increase in ambulation are factors which help immersion to alleviate pain. Aquatic Therapy helps with pain and stiffness, but can also improve quality of life, tone the muscles in the body, and can help with movement in the knees, hips, and back. Moreover, research demonstrates that aquatic therapy is helpful to those who suffer from chronic back pain particularly their lower back. According to the data of the Visual Analogue Scale, people who utilized aquatic therapy as a mechanism to relieve lower back pain have experienced a decrease in pain and overall a better quality of life. Protocols using a combination of strengthening, flexibility, and balance exercises resulted in the greatest improvements in Childhood Health Assessment Questionnaire scores, whereas aerobic exercise did not result in greater improvements in CHAQ scores compared to a comparison group performing Qigong. Not only does aquatic therapy help with pain, but it can also benefit postural stability, meaning it can help to strengthen balance functions especially with people who have neurological disorders. For people diagnosed with Parkinson's disease, aquatic exercise has been proven to be more beneficial than land-based exercise for two important outcome measures. The Berg Balance Scale and Falls Efficacy Scale score were reported to have significant improvement when implementing aquatic exercise over land-based exercise. These results suggest that aquatic exercise can be extremely helpful for Parkinson's disease patients with specific balance disorders and fear of falling. The same concept can be applied to elder adults in need of fall prevention therapy. The use of water assists in providing a safe environment that eliminates the fear of falling and aids in strengthening balance.

For osteoarthritis (OA), aquatic therapy has been shown to decrease pain, increase mobility, and decrease stiffness. According to the Western Ontario and McMaster Universities Osteoarthritis Index (WOMAC) and Visual Analogue Scale (VAS), pain associated with OA has significantly decreased in individuals who performed aquatic therapy. Additionally, due to the nature of aquatic therapy, the temperature and buoyancy of the water have a therapeutic effect on osteoarthritic joints. This improves joint mobility and decreases stiffness.

Aquatic therapy in warm water has been shown to have a positive effect on the aerobic capacity of people with fibromyalgia. It is still inconclusive whether physical therapy is better than aquatic therapy; however, it has been demonstrated that aquatic therapy is as effective as land-based therapy. There are advantageous outcomes for patients with fibromyalgia resulting from aquatic therapy, such as a decrease in articulatory load regarding an individual's biomechanics.

Currently, there is no standardized aquatic therapy protocol for people post stroke; however, it is safe to conclude that aquatic therapy can be more effective than land-based therapy for improving balance and mobility. There is insufficient evidence regarding improvements in the functional independence of people post stroke.

From a cardiopulmonary standpoint, aquatic therapy is often used because its effects mirror land-based effects but at lower speeds. During immersion, blood is displaced upwards into heart and there is an increase in pulse pressure due to increased cardiac filling. Cardiac volume increases 27-30%. Oxygen consumption is increased with exercise, and heart rate is increased at higher temperatures, and decreased at lower temperatures. However, immersion can worsen effects in cases of valvular insufficiency due to this cardiac and stroke volume increase. The aquatic environment is also not recommended for those who experience severe or uncontrolled heart failure.

Aquatic therapy can be used for younger populations or in a pediatric setting. Aquatic therapy improves the trunk structure involved in gross motor function. The role of physical therapists is early intervention to improve their physical, mental, and social recovery. There are different interventions or activity sequences that can be implemented using aquatic therapy to improve specific functions or address specific disabilities in children. In regards to children and aquatic therapy, studies show that aquatic therapy improves motor symptoms, increases physical activity levels (which can be maintained over a long period of time) in children with developmental or motor disabilities. It also has a positive influence on social interactions/behaviors, and participation in children with neurological disorders. Aquatic therapy is beneficial for people with spinal cord injury or disorder. Aquatic therapy promotes physical and psychosocial benefits for patients with spinal cord injury and disorders. In a study, underwater treadmill training improved lower extremity strength, balance and gait in people who suffer from partial damage to their spinal cord. Respiratory function also improved with underwater treadmill training in these individuals. Knowledge of how to use aquatic therapy in application to people with spinal cord injuries or disorders is important because access to aquatic therapy is limited in this population even though there is evidence of significant improvement of many systems/ overall function using aquatic therapy.

Multiple Sclerosis or MS, is a disabling disease that affects one's central nervous system. MS will target the protective sheath (myelin) that covers the nerves. Myelin allows for communication. The destruction of myelin would result in poor communication between the brain and the body. Those with MS will experience neurological damage that impacts physical, cognitive, and psychological and emotional functioning, as well as quality of life. Aquatic therapy offers benefits for this population. By utilizing the physical properties of water such as buoyancy, turbulence, hydrostatic pressure, and hydrostatic resistance, MS patients would be able to work on balance and coordination. This being something that had been compromised with the progression of the disease. The viscosity or thickness of water, allows for MS patients to take their time with their movements. The viscous environment would result in slower more careful movement. Aquatic therapy also offers the benefit of being able to actively use your muscle in order to maintain stabilization within the water itself. Finally, another potential benefit of aquatic therapy and patients with MS is the temperature of the water creating a comfortable environment. Patients with MS experience increased body temperature. Some authors have recommended that water temperature be below 85 °F (29 °C) for MS patients. In the exercise program, a temperature range of 83 to 85 °F (28 to 29 °C) is recommended for low-repeat and low resistance exercises. The benefits of using aquatic therapy would result in a cool-down effect, that would essentially create a more optimal central temperature eventually increasing the ability to perform exercises effectively.

Multiple high-quality research reviews demonstrate that aquatic therapy produces specific clinical outcomes for treating musculoskeletal disorders. A Cochrane systematic review focusing on people with hip and/or knee osteoarthritis found that structured aquatic exercise programs of around 12 weeks’ duration produced small but clinically meaningful short-term improvements in pain, disability, and quality of life compared with control conditions without aquatic therapy. Trial data showed that patients experienced pain and disability score reductions while they reported slight improvements in their quality of life which occurred right after treatment ended. The research results confirmed that aquatic exercise functions as an effective osteoarthritis treatment when combined with existing rehabilitation methods and land-based therapeutic approaches.

Exercise has been shown to decrease the number of osteoporotic fractures in postmenopausal adults. However, the risk of falling along with the intense weight bearing (WB) and dynamic resistance exercises recommended to improve bone mineral density (BMD) typically conflicts with the proclivity of many older and vulnerable individuals. Research shows that the properties of water utilized during Aquatic Therapy, such as buoyancy and water resistance have made statically significant improvements in the BMD of patient's Lumbar Spine (LS) and proximal Femoral Neck (FN), the most important sites for osteoporotic fractures. Due to its safety, Aquatic Therapy is recommended for individuals unable, unmotivated, or scared to perform intense land exercises. Further research is to be completed to determine the effects of specific aquatic exercise properties, such as intensity, frequency and duration on BMD in order to provide effective aquatic program recommendations. Additionally, land-based exercises involving balance and coordination can be a challenge for older adults as many have a fear of falling, but performing these exercises in water is a promising alternative. Not only are you able to move more easily in water, but research has proved that aquatic physical therapy promotes confidence, motor dexterity, range of motion, and center of mass displacement.

== Professional training and certification ==
Aquatic therapy is performed by diverse professionals with specific training and certification requirements. An aquatic therapy specialization is an add-on certification for healthcare providers, mainly including physical therapists and athletic trainers.

For medical purposes, aquatic therapy, as defined by the American Medical Association (AMA), can be performed by various legally-regulated healthcare professionals who have scopes of practice that permit them to offer such services and who are permitted to use AMA Current Procedural Terminology (CPT) codes. Currently, aquatic therapy certification is provided by the Aquatic Therapy and Rehab Institute (ATRI), which aims to further education for therapists and healthcare professionals working in aquatic environments. The ATRI prerequisites for certification include 15 hours of Aquatic Therapy, Rehab and/or Aquatic Therapeutic Exercise education, which can be completed hands-on or online. Once completing the prerequisites, those pursuing certification can take the Aquatic Therapy & Rehab Institutes Aquatic Therapeutic Exercise Certification exam.
