= Aqua cycling =

Fitness training technique

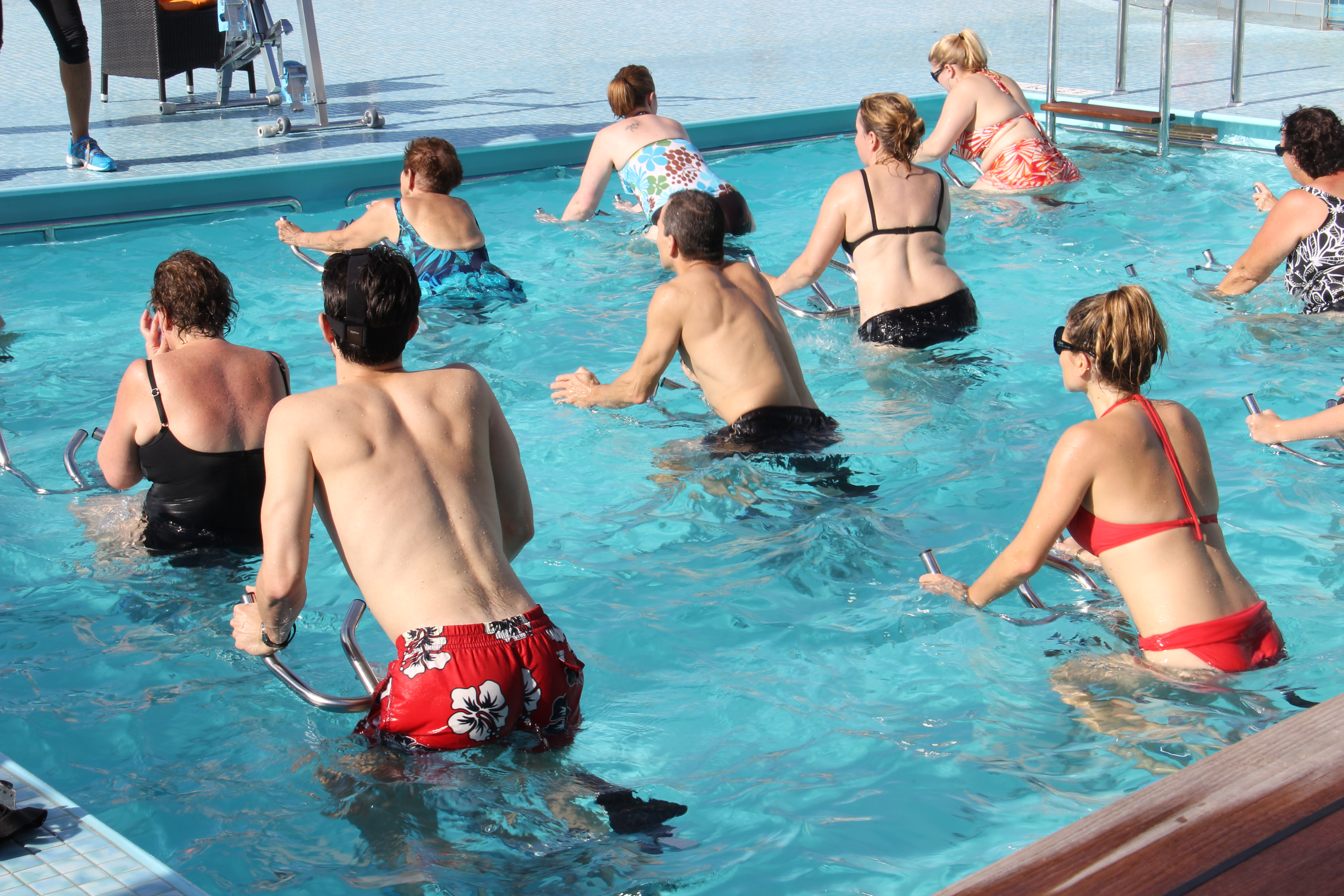
An aqua spinning class

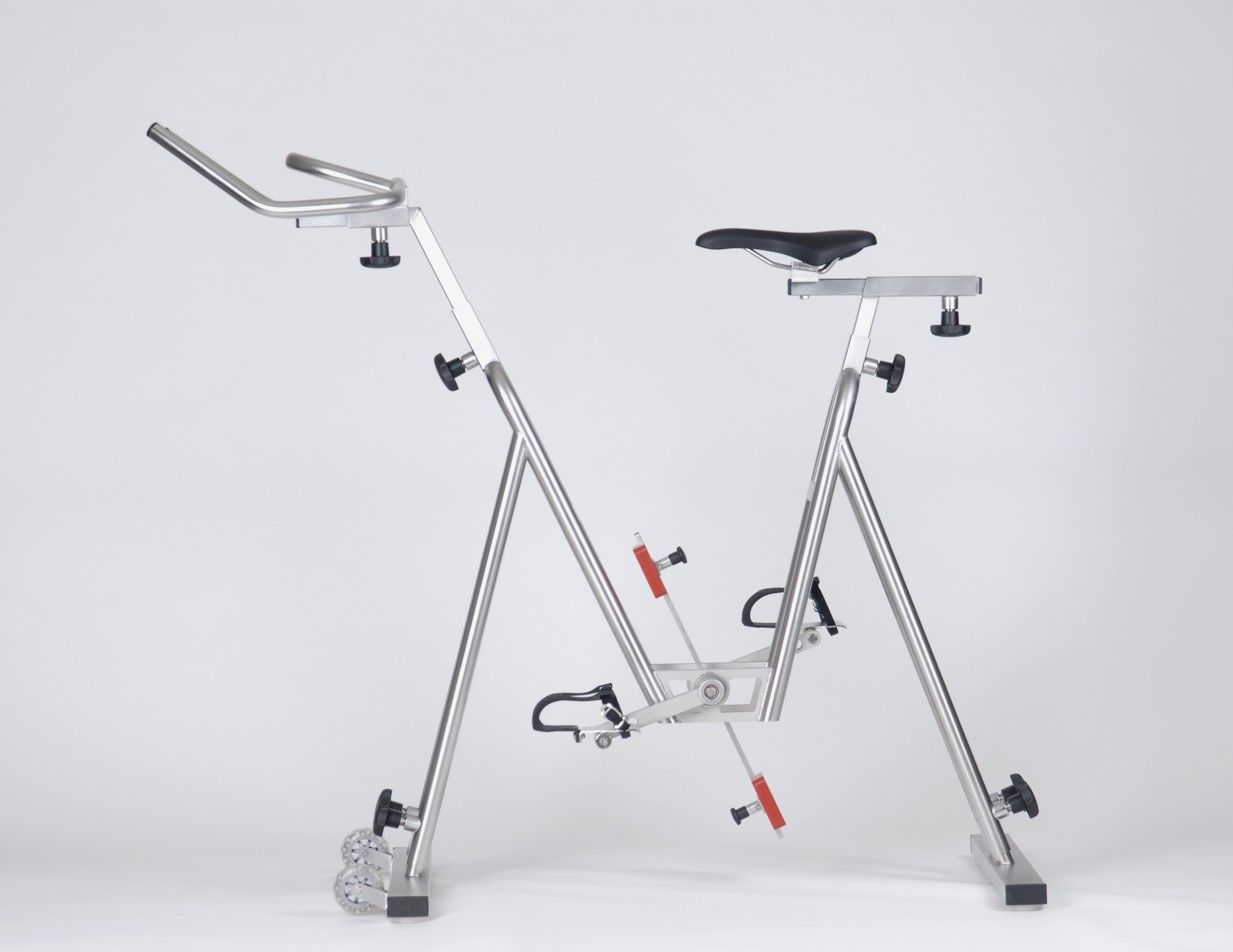
Apparatus for aqua cycling

Aqua cycling or aqua spinning is a technique in fitness training. In aqua cycling, a stationary apparatus similar to a bicycle frame is submerged in a pool, while its rider's upper body remains above the water.

== Private Aqua Cycling ==
Private Aqua Cycling is a fitness concept that combines underwater workout with active balneotherapy in private rooms.

== See also ==
- Water aerobics
- Aquajogging
