= Noseclip =

Device worn during water activities

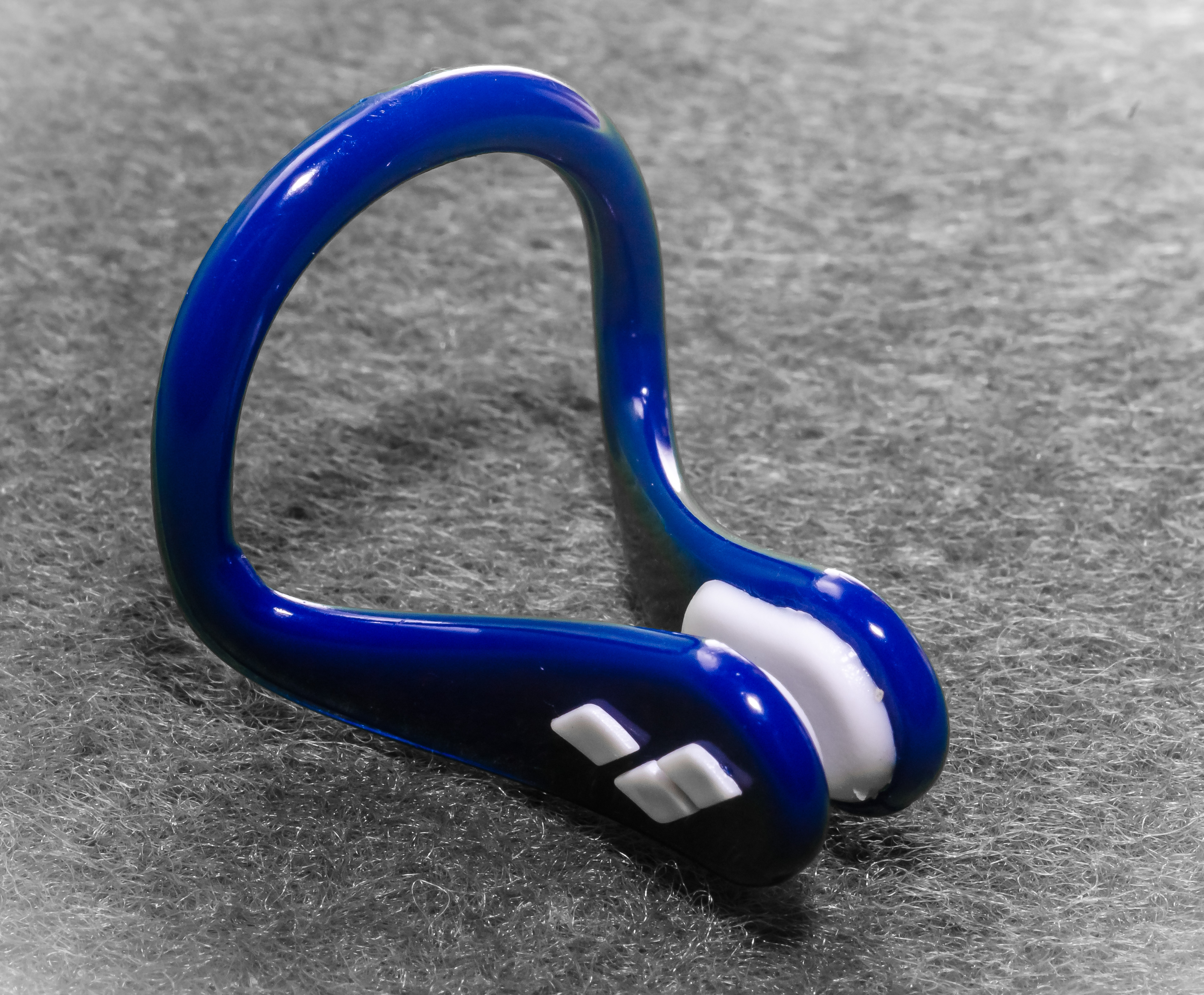
Plastic nose clip

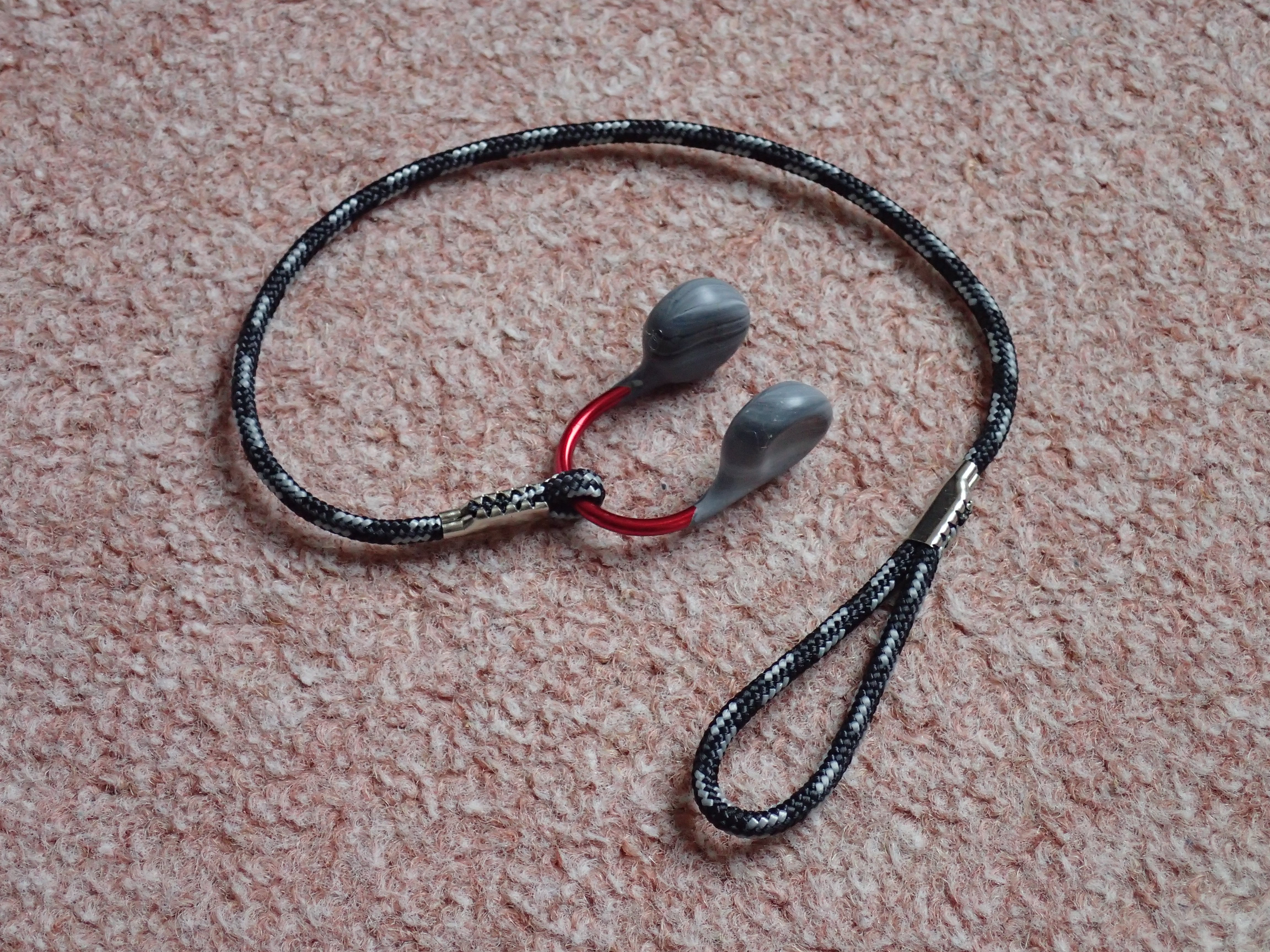
Wire nose clip with tether

A noseclip or nose clip is a device designed to hold the nostrils closed to prevent water from entering, or air from escaping, by people during aquatic activities such as kayaking, freediving, swimming, synchronized swimming and waterdance.

A nose clip is generally made of plastic or of wire covered in rubber or plastic. Nose clips may also have a long band to keep the clip around the neck while it is not being used or a cord to attach the nose clip to goggles or kayaking helmet.

== See also ==
- Nasal strip
