= Water aerobics =

Type of aerobic exercise

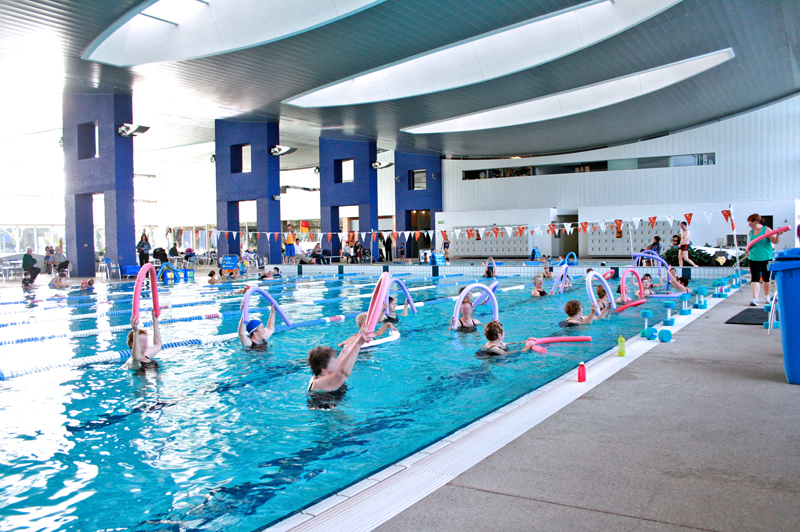
A water aerobics class at an Aquatic Centre

Water aerobics (waterobics, aquarobics, aquatic fitness, aquafitness, aquafit, hydro aerobics) is the performance of aerobic exercise in water such as in a swimming pool. It is done mostly vertically and without swimming typically in waist deep or deeper water. Water aerobics is a form of aerobic exercise that requires water-immersed participants. Most water aerobics is in a group fitness class setting with a trained professional teaching for about an hour. The classes focus on aerobic endurance, resistance training, and creating an enjoyable atmosphere with music. Different forms of water aerobics include: aqua Zumba, water yoga, aqua aerobics, and aqua jog.

== Variation from land-based aerobics ==
While similar to land aerobics, in that it focuses on cardiac training, water aerobics differs in that it adds the component of water resistance and buoyancy. Although heart rate does not increase as much as in land-based aerobics, the heart is working just as hard, and underwater exercise actually pumps more blood to the heart.

Exercising in the water is not only aerobic, but also strength-training oriented due to the water resistance. Moving your body through the water creates a resistance that will activate muscle groups.

== Variation of format ==
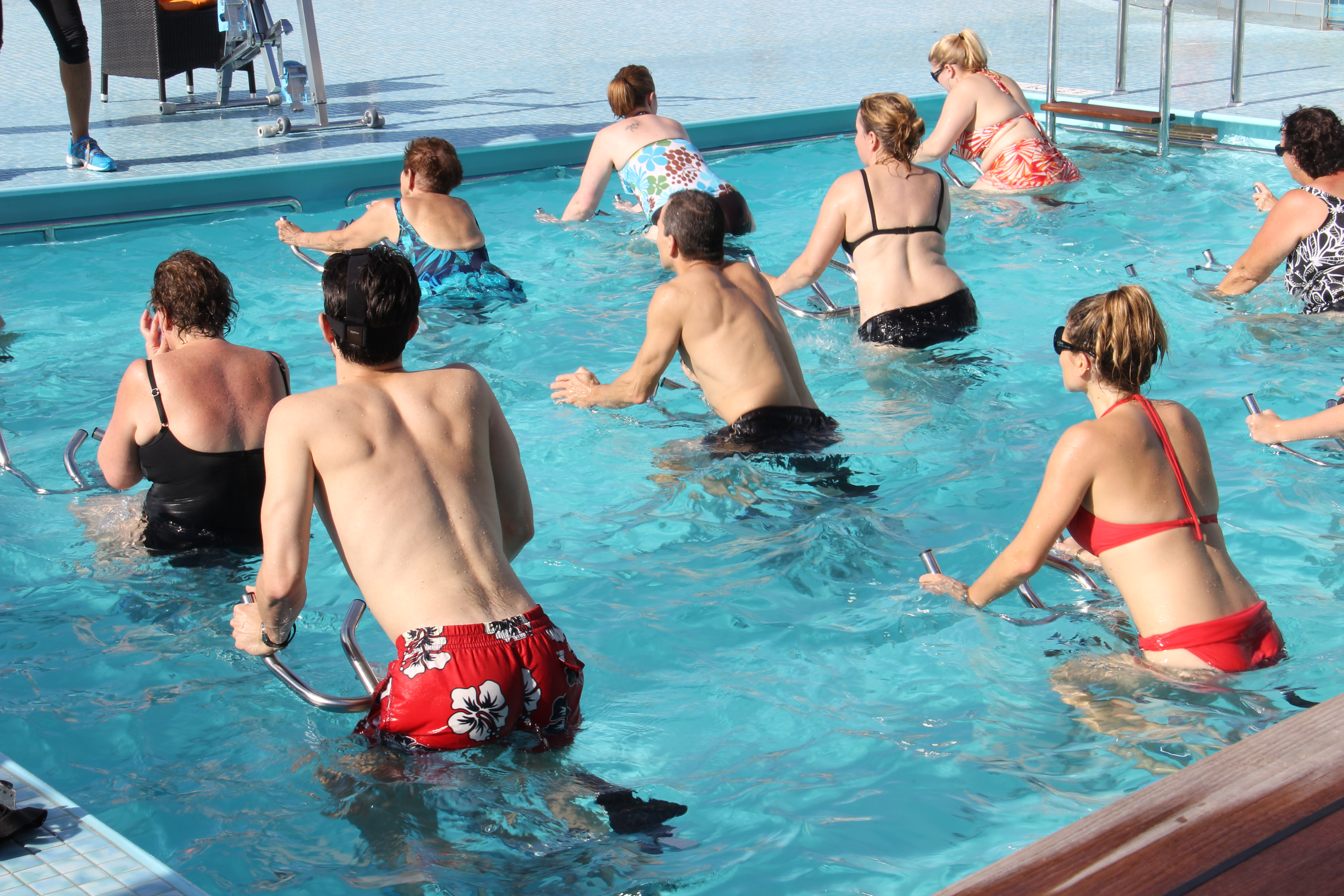
An Aqua cycling class

New aquatic formats are arising into the exercise world, with ideas such as: aqua cycling and water pole dancing. Water aerobics is beneficial to a multitude of participants because the density of the water allows easy mobility for those with arthritis, obesity, and other conditions. Further, it is an effective way for people of all ages to incorporate aerobics and muscle-strengthening into their weekly exercise schedule. Most classes last for 45–55 minutes. People do not even have to be strong swimmers to participate in water aerobics.

The performance of movement while suspended in water where the feet cannot touch the bottom surface, resulting in a non-impact, high-resistant, total body exercise workout, is known as deep water aerobics. Benefits of this method include less stress on the back, hips, knees and ankles.

== Benefits ==
Most land-based aerobic exercisers do not incorporate strength training into their schedules, and therefore, adding aquatic exercise can greatly improve their health. As stated by the U.S. Department of Health and Human Services (2018), "Adults should also [in addition to aerobic exercise] do muscle-strengthening activities of moderate or greater intensity and that involve all major muscle groups on 2 or more days a week, as these activities provide additional health benefits." Over time, water aerobics can lead to a reduction of blood pressure and resting heart rate, which will improve health overall.

According to Moreno (1996) and her quotes from Huey, an Olympic athlete trainer, the benefits of water resistance training include the activation of opposing muscle groups for a balanced workout. The push and pull of the water allows both increased muscle training and a built-in safety barrier for joints. In fact, before water aerobics, injury therapy used the benefits of water. The water also helps to reduce lactic acid buildup. Another obvious benefit to water exercise is the cooling effect of the water on the system. With the average temperature in a group fitness pool being around 26 °C (78 °F), this temperature will force the body to burn calories to stay at homeostasis while also maintaining a cool, comfortable atmosphere with less sweat noticeable to the participant.

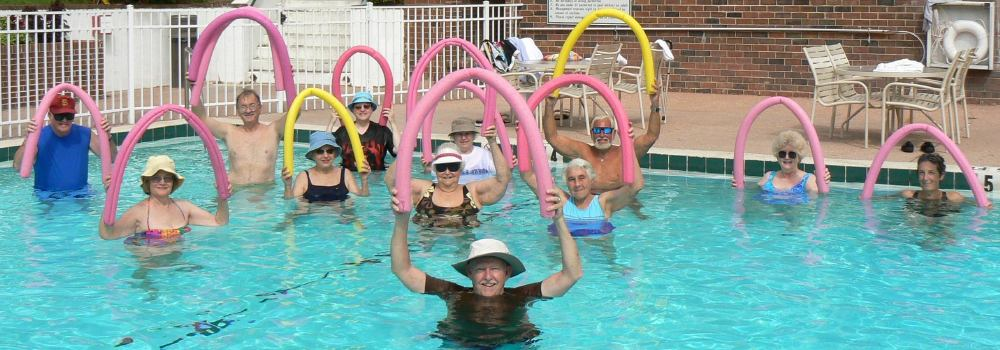
A water aerobics class incorporating flotation devices

The mitigation of gravity makes water aerobics safe for individuals able to keep their heads out of water, including the elderly. Exercise in water can also prevent overheating through continuous cooling of the body. Older people are more prone to arthritis, osteoporosis, and weak joints, therefore water aerobics is the safest form of exercise for these conditions. In a study done in Brazil, “Effects of water-based exercise in obese older women: Impact of short-term follow-up study on anthropometric, functional fitness and quality of life parameters” the effects of long-term water aerobics was tested. Although it did not conclude exactly as planned, their test subjects did experience improved aerobic capacity, muscle endurance, and better overall life quality. The water also provides a stable environment for elderly with less balance control and therefore prevents injury.

== Disadvantages ==
Water aerobics has a few disadvantages from a practicality standpoint. Aqua aerobics requires access to a swimming pool and, in addition to any membership fees, classes may cost extra. Although aquatic exercise greatly reduces the risk of injury, it is typically seen that fewer calories are burned than would be in some other activities. Though aquatic activities in general expend more energy than many land-based activities performed at the same pace due to the increased resistance of water, the speed with which movements can be performed is greatly reduced.

== See also ==
- Aquajogging, a similar program for surgical patients
- Underwater cycling
- Swimming (sport)
- Synchronised swimming
- Water polo
