= Nasal strip =

Adhesive bandage used to keep the nose airway open

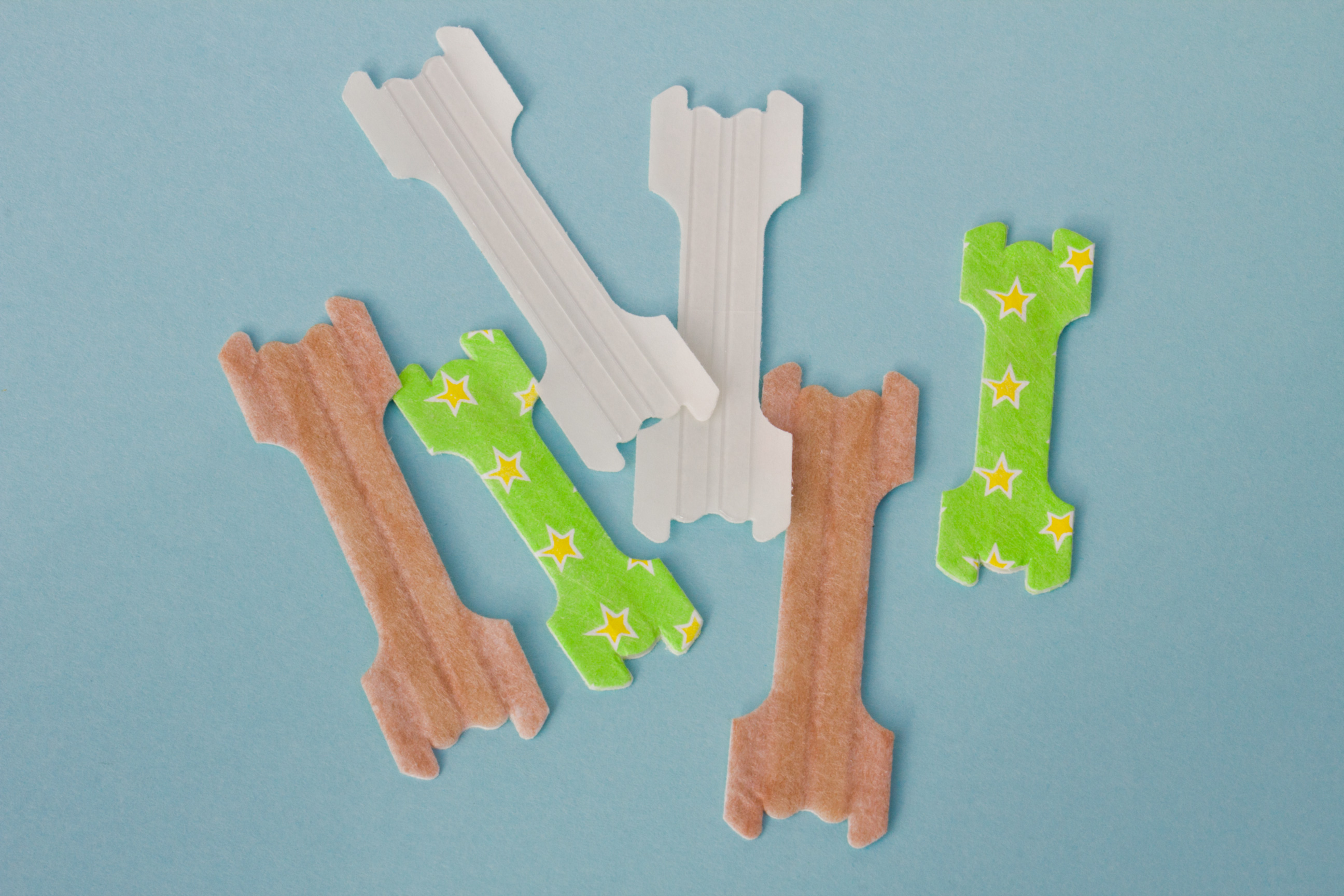
Nasal strips, designed for humans, in varying colors and sizes

A nasal strip, external nasal dilator strip or nasal dilator strip is a type of adhesive bandage with embedded plastic ribs or splints that is applied across the bridge of the nose and sides of the nostrils, to assist in keeping the airway open. They are believed to make breathing easier and for that reason are used during athletic exertion and as an aid to reduce congestion or to prevent snoring. Various studies have indicated that they do not have a performance-enhancing effect. They are also used by race horse trainers on horses for similar reasons; they are thought to reduce airway resistance and lower the risk of exercise-induced pulmonary hemorrhage (EIPH), plus reduce fatigue and aid post-race recovery.

== Human use ==
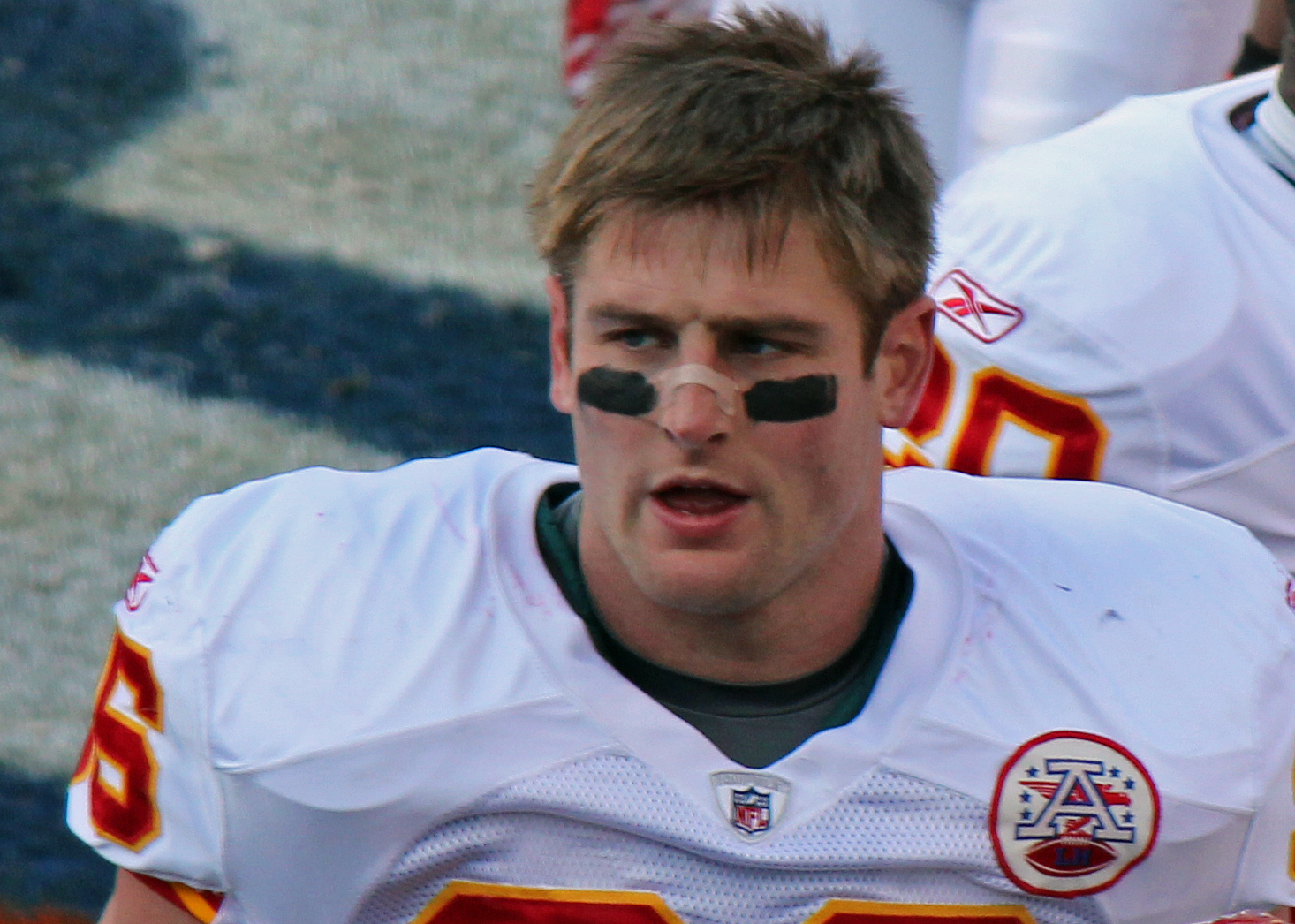
A gridiron football player wearing a nasal strip

In humans, the nasal valve is the narrowest part of the nasal aperture and when exercising, this area is subjected to negative pressure and becomes smaller. Nasal strips adhere to the skin, holding open the anterior nasal aperture and prevent it from collapsing. When properly applied, they lift and widen the space in the nasal passage. They are a drug-free method to maintain airway flow and are available as an over the counter product. They have no reported side effects other than possible skin irritation from the adhesive.

One study indicated that they are useful in increasing nasal cavity volume in the front three centimeters of the human nose, and for that purpose could be an alternative to decongestive nose sprays, offering equivalent effect on air inflow. The study found that nasal strips had no effect on congestion in the posterior nasal apertures. Subjects in a study on athletes wearing mouth guards along with nasal strips indicated that they believed that the strips helped them breathe more easily. However, that study found no evidence of improved athletic performance, but people wearing them seem to have far less dyspnea or shortness of breath while exercising. Nasal strips are sometimes recommended as a treatment for snoring, although their effectiveness is not well understood.

== Equine use ==
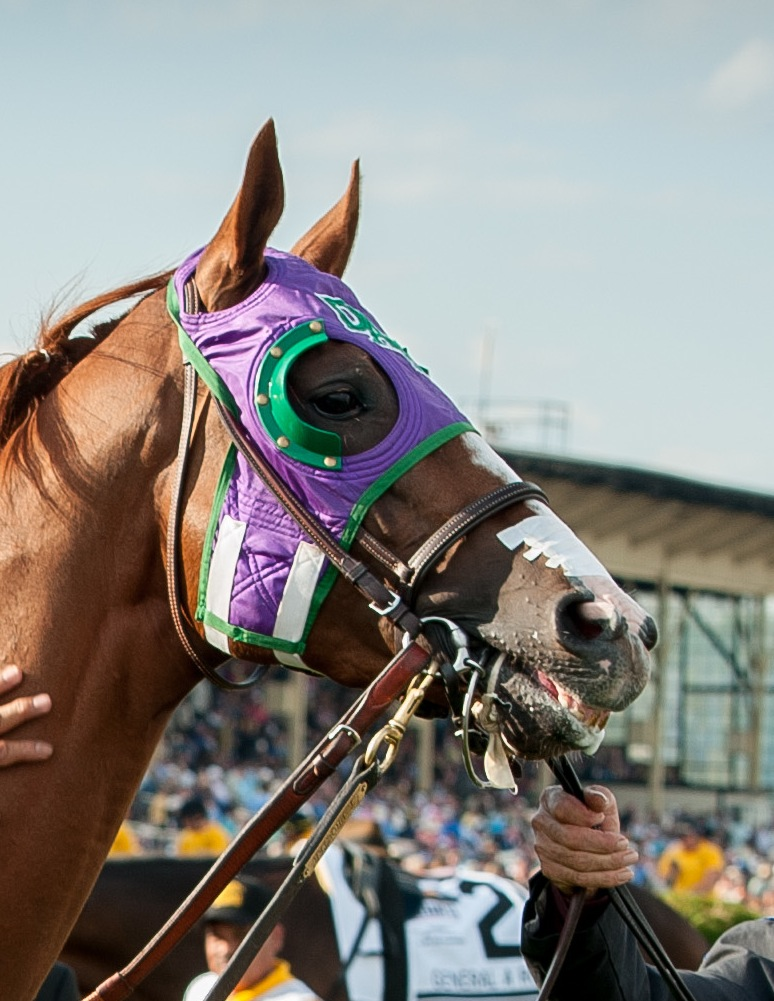
Equine nasal strip worn by California Chrome

In horses, they are viewed as helpful because the animals cannot breathe through their mouths, only through their nostrils. As with humans, the equine design helps keep the nasal valve from collapsing due to the negative pressure created by physical exertion. However, their primary benefit is preventing lung bleeding (EIPH), not directly enhancing performance. The equine version was invented by two veterinarians, James Chiapetta and Edward Blach. In the 1990s, they were inspired by the human product to attempt to create a similar device for horses. They had observed horses on treadmills and saw that, under exertion, the equine nasal passage also narrowed due to the tissue being sucked in. They worked out a licensing agreement with CNS, the company that manufactured the human "Breathe Right" brand of nasal strips in 1997 (now owned by Prestige Consumer Healthcare) where the company manufactured the equine form of the nasal strip, and paid royalties to Chiapetta and Blach. The equine version was first used publicly at the 1999 Breeders' Cup horse races and the 2000 Summer Olympics. In 2001, they parted ways with CNS and formed their own company, Flair, and in 2008, Chiapetta bought the rights to Blach's design.

== See also ==
- Nasal clip
- Oral appliance
