= Harbin Hot Springs =

- Retreat
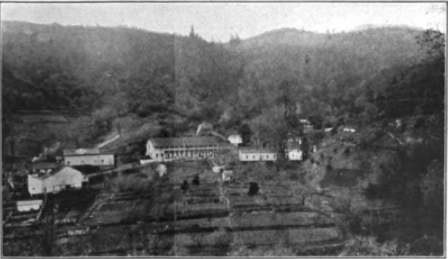
- Harbin Hot Springs in 1915

- Location within California Location within the United States
- Coordinates: 38.78742°N 122.65379°W
- Country: United States
- State: California
- County: Lake County
- Website: harbin.org Harbin Hot Springs on Facebook

Harbin Hot Springs is a hot spring retreat and workshop center situated at Harbin Springs (formerly, Harbin Hot Springs and Harbin's Springs) in Lake County, Northern California. Operated by Heart Consciousness Church, a non-profit, it is named after Matthew Harbin, a pioneer who settled in the Lake County area. Located approximately two hours north of the San Francisco Bay Area, in the United States, the facility suffered partial destruction in the Valley Fire in September 2015, resulting in its temporary closure. It partially reopened in January 2019, including the main pools and sauna, along with a limited cafeteria service.

The clothing-optional retreat center is known as an outdoor spa with a New Age ambiance, where Watsu was developed.

== Location ==
The three springs are 20 miles (32 km) north of Calistoga, 3.5 miles (5.6 km) northwest of Middletown, 3.5 miles (5.6 km) east-southeast of Whispering Pines, and ten miles south of Clear Lake. They are at an elevation of about 1,568 feet (478 m).

Three springs, known as the Arsenic, Iron and Sulphur springs, rise close together in a ravine on the west of a branch of Putah Creek. The hills near Harbin Springs have steep slopes of exposed shale, but there is a belt of amphibolite schist starting about 25 yards (23 m) above the springs.

== Springs ==
A 1909 report said the Arsenic, Iron and Sulphur springs yielded water at temperatures of 90 °F (32 °C), 116 °F (47 °C), and 120 °F (49 °C) at rates of 1 US gallon per minute (230 L/h), 1/2 US gallon per minute (110 L/h), and 8.5 US gallons per minute (1,900 L/h) respectively. A 1914 report listed the springs and their temperatures as: Hot Sulphur, 120.5 °F (49.2 °C); Iron, 118 °F (48 °C); Magnesia, 66 °F (19 °C); Cold White Sulphur, 76 °F (24 °C); Mud Foot Bath, 101 °F (38 °C) in the water on top and 121 °F (49 °C) in the mud and fine rocks below. The flow from Hot Sulphur was said to be 1,500 US gallons per hour (5,700 L/h). A fresh water spring filled a 30,000 US gallons (110,000 L; 25,000 imp gal) tank in two days, which was used for fire purposes.

== History ==
The springs had been utilized by the local indigenous people before European settlers arrived. James M. Harbin came to California in 1846 and co-discovered the springs in 1852, assuming control of the land where Harbin Hot Springs is located, and bestowed his name upon both the springs and the adjacent Harbin Mountain. Harbin bought out his partner in 1860. By 1870, a new owner named Richard Williams had established the Harbin Springs Health and Pleasure Resort, featuring a large hotel built on the slope below the springs. Due to the region's susceptibility to wildfires, successive lodges have been rebuilt over the years following their destruction by fire.

By 1909 there were accommodations for around 200 people in a hotel, a three-story rooming house, eight or ten cottages and a dozen tent houses. A large building held a gymnasium and dancing floor. In 1913 they were owned by Mrs. Margaret Matthews of Vallejo, who was leasing them to Booth, Carr and Booth. The resort could accommodate 300 people. There were two steam baths and two swimming pools, of which the larger was outdoors. One of the steam baths was a covered pool from the Hot Sulphur spring. Harbin Hot Springs issued several postcards advertising the resort in the 1920s and 1930s.

By 1969 the property was owned by Sandia Corporation, which was interested in the potential for geothermal energy. In the late 1960s and early 1970s, the property was run as a commune with the name Harbinger commune, "centered around a man named Don Hamrick, a charismatic fellow who wore business suits and combined science with spiritualism in his lectures/sermons". In 1969, Harbinger had about 120 people, but ultimately, the community did not thrive. In 1972 Robert Hartley bought the property and renovated the run-down facilities.

He sold it to Heart Consciousness Church in 1992. As of 2012, the clothing-optional retreat center was known as an outdoor spa with a New Age ambiance, where Watsu was developed.

The resort was evacuated because of the Valley Fire on September 12, 2015. By September 14, Harbin was almost completely destroyed by the fire with only the pool complex largely intact. SunRay Kelly had designed and built the Harbin Hot Springs Temple, a yoga and meditation space, which burned down in 2015. In January 2019 it partially reopened, including the main pools and sauna, and a limited cafeteria service.

== Modern establishment ==
Robert Hartley (also known as Ishvara) bought the land in 1972 to be a Gestalt center. Sold to the Heart Consciousness Church (HCC) in 1975, Harbin/HCC operates as a Retreat Center. Harbin/HCC maintains a more specifically religious organization, the New Age Church of Being, incorporated in 1996. Harbin is a center for the expression of New Age beliefs. Harbin's clothing-optional policy, its pools, and the natural beauty of the local landscape are part of Harbin's appeal to visitors, who must agree to membership, if only temporarily, for admission.

Harbin has been a center for the development of new modes of healing and personal development, including Watsu (water shiatsu), a massage technique created by Harold Dull at Harbin in the early 1980s. Watsu, based on gently moving the body through water, is now practiced in spas throughout the world.

== Sources ==
- Hamilton, Fletcher (July 1915), "Report of State Mineralogist, 1913-1914", Appendix to the Journals of the Senate and Assembly of the forty-second session of the Legislature of the State of California, vol. VII
- "Harbin Springs", Geographic Names Information System, United States Geological Survey, United States Department of the Interior, January 19, 1981
- History of the Springs, Harbin Hot Springs
- Ishvara (2002). Oneness in Living: Kundalini Yoga, the Spiritual Path, and the Intentional Community. Berkeley, CA, US: North Atlantic Books. ISBN 9781556434136. OCLC 49276954.
- Klages, Ellen (1991). Harbin Hot Springs: Healing Waters, Sacred Land. Middletown, CA, US: Harbin Springs Publishing. ISBN 0944202012. OCLC 23144182.
- Waring, Gerald Ashley (1915). Springs of California. U.S. Geological Survey Water Supply Paper. Vol. 338. U.S. Government Printing Office. doi:10.3133/wsp338.
- Wester, John (October 21, 2009). "Speed Willy". Anderson Valley Advertiser.
