= Harold Dull =

American aquatic bodyworker and poet (1935–2019)

- Born: December 18, 1935; Seattle, Washington, U.S.
- Died: July 31, 2019 (aged 83); Berkeley, California, U.S.
- Education: University of Washington
- Notable work: Watsu
- Website: www.watsu.com

Harold Dull (1935—2019) was an American aquatic bodyworker and poet best known as the creator of Watsu, originally developed in the early 1980s at Harbin Hot Springs, California. He is also known for his poetry, as founder of the Worldwide Aquatic Bodywork Association (WABA), and as creator of Tantsu and Tantsuyoga. Watsu is a form of aquatic bodywork in which a practitioner or therapist gently cradles, moves, stretches, and massages a receiver in chest-deep warm water for deep relaxation and aquatic therapy.

== Early life and education ==
Harold Dull was born in December 18, 1935 in Seattle, Washington.

Harold Dull received his BA and MA degrees at the University of Washington. Dull also gained proficiency in several languages.

Dull began writing poetry in 1955, while a student of Stanley Kunitz and Theodore Roethke at the University of Washington. After graduation in 1957 he participated in regular meetings of poets with Jack Spicer and Robert Duncan in San Francisco, and published several small books of poetry with the San Francisco Renaissance presses Open Space and White Rabbit Press.

Starting in 1976, Dull studied in Zen Shiatsu in America and in Japan, where he studied with Shizuto Masunaga, the original creator of Shiatsu. He also studied with Reuho Yamada and Wataru Ohashi, the teachers who first introduced Shiatsu to the United States.

== Development of Watsu ==
In the early 1980s, while teaching at the School of Shiatsu and Massage at Harbin Hot Springs, California, Harold Dull began adapting Zen Shiatsu for water. He experimented with floating people in the warm water natural springs, incorporating breathing patterns, meditative presence, and meridian stretches in sessions. He called this new form of aquatic bodywork Watsu, a contraction of Water Shiatsu. Dull discovered that Watsu induced deep relaxation, with profound physical and emotional effects.

Dull, with his background in creative arts, poetry, and English teaching, originally focused on Watsu as a meditative and nurturing practice, and emphasized "heart connection". In the 1980s, Dull practiced and developed the techniques with various volunteers from the Harbin community, primarily massage therapists and yoga practitioners. Originally Watsu was developed for everybody – adolescents, young and old adults, pregnant women, athletes, and those suffering from stress. A wide variety of providers now offer Watsu, including psychologists, psychiatrists, physical therapists, massage therapists, and lay people.

By the late 1980s and early 1990s, physical therapists and other healthcare providers began to use Watsu with their patients for diverse orthopedic and neurologic conditions. In those early years, there was some resistance to Watsu among those trained in conventional healthcare, primarily because of the roots in Shiatsu and the close physical contact. As increasing numbers of therapists have incorporated Watsu into their treatment programs, Watsu gained increasing acceptance as a form of aquatic therapy, and Watsu is now practiced a spa, clinics, health centers, and hospitals worldwide.

== Contributions ==
Dull is most notable for his work creating and developing Watsu. Watsu is a form of aquatic bodywork used for relaxation and passive aquatic therapy, characterized by one-on-one sessions in which a practitioner or therapist gently cradles, moves, stretches, and massages a receiver in chest-deep warm water.

=== Worldwide Aquatic Bodywork Association (WABA) ===
Dull founded the Worldwide Aquatic Bodywork Association (WABA), and served as president for various years. The Worldwide Aquatic Bodywork Registry (WABR) stores records for students and professional aquatic bodyworkers.

=== Harbin Hot Springs massage school and Watsu facilities ===
Harold Dull has had a long-term association with Harbin Hot Springs, widely known as the birthplace of Watsu. He lived there beginning in 1980 as a teacher and resident, owned and ran the massage school from 1985 to 2008, and helped design and build the extensive Watsu aquatic facilities.

In 1979, the Niyama School of Healing Arts was established at Harbin Hot Springs. In 1985, the school was purchased by Harold Dull and renamed the School of Shiatsu and Massage, which was later bought and operated by the Worldwide Aquatic Bodywork Association (WABA). In 2008, the school was purchased and operated by the Bodywork Career Institute, LLC. In 2013, the school was purchased by Harbin Hot Springs and began operating under the name Harbin School of Healing Arts.

=== Teaching ===
Dull taught Watsu and Tantsu courses worldwide. He has taught in 27 countries, including Brazil, Argentina, Chile, Costa Rica, Mexico, Japan, Korea, Australia, New Zealand, India, Israel, and almost every country in Europe.

=== Poetry ===
Harold Dull's poetry was published in a collected volume in 2007.

=== Tantsu and Tantsuyoga ===
Harold Dull developed Tantsu in order to "bring back onto land Watsu's nurturing holding, and the joy of the movement freed when floating someone level with the heart". The Tantsu form "gradually builds trust through unconditional holding". Tantsuyoga is a related form that "celebrates union".

== Publications ==
Dull's publications concern Watsu, Tantsu, and poetry:

- Dull, Harold. 1958. Bird Poems. White Rabbit Press. ASIN: B001VELDPA.
- Dull, Harold. 1963. The Wood Climbed Down Out Of. White Rabbit Press. ASIN: B0067ANA9K.
- Dull, Harold. 1964. The Door. Open Space Publishing. ASIN B003QA28SI.
- Dull, Harold. 1967. The Star Year. White Rabbit Press. ASIN B002SGQ8F0.
- Dull, Harold. 1987. Bodywork Tantra on Land and in the Water, Loose Pages Edition. Harbin Springs. ASIN: B003DWUFUC.
- Dull, Harold. 1991. Bodywork Tantra on Land and in the Water. Worldwide Aquatic Bodywork Association. ISBN 978-0944202005.
- Dull, Harold. 1993. Watsu: Freeing the Body in Water, 1st edition. Harbin Springs Publishing. ISBN 978-0944202043
- Dull, Harold. 1997. Watsu: Freeing the Body in Water, 2nd edition. Harbin Springs Publishing. ISBN 978-0944202111.
- Dull, Harold. 2004. Watsu: Freeing the Body in Water, 3rd edition. Watsu Publishing. ISBN 978-1412034395.
- Dull, Harold. 2007. Finding Ways to Water: Collected Poems 1955-2007. Watsu Publishing. ISBN 978-1604616576.
- Dull, Harold. 2008. Watsu: Freeing the Body in Water, 4th edition. Watsu Publishing. ISBN 978-1605853710.
- Dull, Harold. 2008. Tantsu: Yoga of the Heart. Watsu Publishing. ISBN 978-1607250111.
- Dull, Harold. 2010. Watsu Basic and Explorer Paths. Watsu Publishing. ISBN 978-0984451500.

== Honors and awards ==
Dull has received various awards for his contribution in creating Watsu:

- International Aquatics Award from the United States Water Fitness Association
- Honored at the National Aquatic Exercise Conference in Japan
- Tsunami Spirit Award, 1998, from the Aquatic Therapy and Rehabilitation Institute.
