= Ai Chi =

Ai Chi is a form of aquatic exercise used for recreation, relaxation, fitness, and physical rehabilitation. Clinical Ai Chi is distinguished as a specialized, active form of aquatic therapy. In essence, Ai Chi uses breathing techniques and progressive resistance training in water to relax and strengthen the body, based on elements of qigong and tai chi.

== Overview ==
Ai Chi is a total body relaxation and strengthening progression used for aquatic therapy. This aquatic technique is characterized by slow movement coordinated with deep breathing, based on elements of qigong and tai chi.

Ai Chi was developed in 1993 by Jun Konno (Aquadynamics Institute, Yokohama, Japan) as an exercise to prepare for Watsu. The term Clinical Ai Chi distinguishes a more specialized form used for specific therapeutic applications.

== Technique ==
Typically, Ai Chi is practiced standing in shoulder-depth water in group classes, one-on-one therapy sessions, or individually. Initially, Ai Chi focuses on deep breathing patterns. Simple breathing techniques are then combined with gentle movement in a progression from the upper extremities, trunk, lower extremities, and finally to involvement of the full torso, with a gradual narrowing of the base of support. Movement is slow and continuous, with attention to body alignment, and accompanied by deep diaphragmatic breathing and a calm meditative state of mind. Mental focus is on flowing movement, proper body alignment, and coordinated breathing, and can also involve attention to philosophical or aesthetic concepts.

Ai Chi consists of 19 movements or katas, performed while breathing at a rate of about 14-16 breaths per minute. The first six arm movements are based on qigong, with a relatively static and symmetrical body posture. The subsequent movements are based on tai chi, with continuous shifting of the center of gravity. The progression moves through a series of "regulatory conditions" of increasing difficulty, from static to dynamic, symmetrical to rotatory and asymmetrical movement, and visual to non-visual (vestibular) control.
