= Watsu =

Form of aquatic bodywork

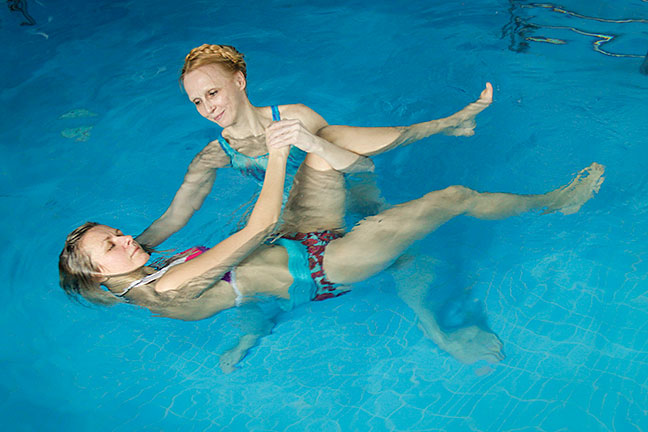

Watsu is a form of aquatic bodywork used for deep relaxation and passive aquatic therapy. Watsu is characterized by one-on-one sessions in which a practitioner or therapist gently cradles, moves, stretches, and massages a receiver in chest-deep warm water.

Watsu, originally developed by Harold Dull at Harbin Hot Springs, California, in the early 1980s, combines elements of muscle stretching, joint mobilization, massage, Shiatsu, and dance, performed in chest-deep warm water (around 35°C = 95°F). The receiver is continuously supported by a practitioner or therapist while being backfloated, rhythmically cradled, moved, stretched, and massaged.

== History and origins ==
In the early 1980s Harold Dull adapted Zen Shiatsu for use in warm water pools at Harbin Hot Springs in northern California, with emphasis on connecting with the breathing patterns of the receiver and establishing a meditative state during sessions. Dull observed that people receiving Watsu treatments entered a deep relaxation state, with strong physical and emotional effects. In the early years, massage therapists were the main practitioners of Watsu, offering sessions as a new category of aquatic therapy called aquatic bodywork. By the late 1980s and early 1990s, physical therapists and other healthcare providers began applying Watsu to treat diverse orthopedic and neurologic conditions. While Watsu's roots in Shiatsu and the close physical contact led to some early resistance among those trained in conventional healthcare, Watsu is now practiced in spas, clinics, and hospitals, and utilized as an aquatic rehabilitation technique.

== Technique ==
Watsu is performed in one-on-one pool sessions in chest-deep warm water. During a session, a provider (practitioner or therapist) gently cradles, moves, stretches, and massages a receiver (client or patient). A typical session consists of a progression of breath coordination, movement patterns in different positions, and massage. Movement patterns including gentle cradling and rocking, more dynamic stretching and mobilization, stillness, and specific mobilization techniques focused on the needs or condition of the receiver. A session may last anywhere from a few minutes to longer than an hour. During a session, the provider continually monitors the state of the receiver, mindful of subtle changes in muscle tension and respiration, and responsive to adapt the treatment accordingly.

=== Opening ===
Before starting a pool session, the provider meets with the receiver to fill out paperwork, answer questions, review referrals and records, and discuss needs, expectations, and health condition. The receiver is fitted with floats around the upper shins or lower thighs to prevent the legs from sinking. The session starts with the receiver seated or crouched at the pool edge. The provider faces the receiver, coordinates breathing, and then gently draws the receiver into a back floating position called "first position".

=== First position techniques ===
In "first position", the receiver floats facing upward while the provider supports the receiver's head in the crook of one arm and maintains gentle traction of the spine from the base of the skull (occiput) to the base of the spine (sacrum). The provider gently sways from leg to leg ("horse to horse stance") or forcefully moves in deep lunges in alternating directions ("warrior to warrior stance"), producing rocking and wave patterns in the receiver. Typical Watsu moves use turbulent drag to produce traction and softly stretch the limbs and torso. Movements include slow rocking, arm and leg stretches, trunk rotations and stretches, and various oscillation and pulsing patterns. Moves are repeated on both sides for balance.

Basic Watsu moves include the following:

- Water Breath Dance – stillness and gentle motion coordinated with up and down shifts in buoyancy as the receiver breathes;
- Slow Offering – gentle pulling alternately headward by the base of the skull (occiput) and footward by the base of the spine (sacrum), to produce traction of the spine along with centripetal side force;
- Free Spine – gentle oscillation of the spine;
- One Leg Offering – gentle pulling alternately headward by the base of the skull (occiput) and footward by one leg, to produce a complex pattern of turbulent drag, with leg, torso, and spine stretches;
- Two Leg Offering – gentle pulling alternately headward by the base of the skull (occiput) and footward by both legs, to produce a complex pattern of turbulent drag, with leg, torso, and spine stretches;
- Accordion – drawing both knees toward and away from the chest in coordination with the breath, while maintaining neck traction;
- Rotating Accordion – adding a spiraling rotation to the accordion action of moving both knees toward and away from the chest, while maintaining support of the occiput and allowing the head more freedom to roll;
- Near Leg Rotation – opening and closing the near leg toward and away from the chest to produce an oscillating spine and hip rotation;
- Far Leg Rotation – opening and closing the far leg toward and away from the chest to produce an oscillating spine and hip rotation.

=== Other positions and techniques ===
Other positions and techniques have been developed to produce specific effects and to address specific parts of the body. For example, a "head pull" permits gentle traction and mobilization of the neck, "seaweed position" permits mobilization and rotation of the spine and hips, and "full saddle" permits stretching and massage of the side body and limbs.

=== Adapting Watsu for special needs ===
A specialized set of techniques have been developed to adapt Watsu for receivers with special needs. For clients with severe spasticity, the usual turbulent drag is not sufficient to stretch the body. Additional manual pressure is applied to sustain gentle, prolonged stretches, for example attaining trunk rotation by pressing the opposite shoulder while pulling the knees. Head pillows and other additional floats are often used for specific therapeutic techniques, similar to how rings or floats are used for the Bad Ragaz Ring Method for aquatic rehabilitation.

== Training and certification ==
The Worldwide Aquatic Bodywork Association (WABA) oversees training programs for certification in Watsu and related aquatic bodywork forms (WaterDance, Healing Dance, Aquatic Integration...). WABA also maintains an official registry of certified practitioners and instructors, classes, and training institutes. Training consists of basic and advanced coursework, as well as logged practice and demonstration of mastery. Certification levels include "Provider", "Practitioner", "Therapist", "Assistant", and "Instructor".

== Health effects ==
=== Physiological effects ===
During a Watsu session, the recipient's heart and respiration rates decrease, depth of respiration increases, muscle tone decreases, and recipients report a deep state of relaxation. Robert Scaer suggested that deep relaxation of Watsu balances the autonomic nervous system (ANS), decreasing sympathetic response and increasing parasympathetic response, with far-reaching benefits. Compressive forces of hydrostatic pressure combine with deep relaxation to enhance functioning of the lymphatic system and reduce swelling in cases of edema. For orthopedic impairments, combined effects of relaxation, warm water, and gentle movement decreases muscle spasm, provides pain relief, improves soft tissue mobility, and increases range of motion. The rhythmic rocking motions combined with repeated trunk rotation and elongation relaxes muscles and improves mobility.

=== Psychological effects ===
Many patients and clinicians report psychological benefits for stress reduction and resolving past traumas.

== Applications ==
Watsu is offered along with other forms for bodywork and massage at spas, recreation facilities, and retreat centers, and offered as a form of aquatic therapy at clinics, hospitals, and healthcare centers.

=== General use ===
For healthy people, Watsu is used for relaxation, muscle stretching, and "nurturing connection".

=== Orthopedic and neurologic rehabilitation ===
For physical rehabilitation, Watsu is used by aquatic therapists to improve function and increase quality of life. Watsu has been applied for treatment of patients with orthopedic and neurologic impairment, in particular for limitations in range of motion from soft tissue restrictions, muscle spasm (hypertonicity), and pain. By improving soft tissue mobility and decreasing spasm, patients can respond better to functional activities. For severe cases, short periods of Watsu can be alternated with short periods of functional activities.

Watsu has been proposed as a therapy for fibromyalgia syndrome, and for rehabilitating patients after a stroke.

Little research has been done on Watsu. Various extrapolations concerning therapeutic effects have been made from research in established areas of therapy, in particular proprioceptive neuromuscular facilitation (PNF) and sensory integration.

=== Psychological rehabilitation ===
For psychological rehabilitation, Watsu has been used to improve psychological function by calming the nervous system, enhancing relaxation, increasing body awareness and decreasing general anxiety. Watsu is sometimes recommended as an adjunct therapy to help process trauma, in conjunction with a psychotherapist.

== Precautions ==
As with all aquatic activities, Watsu has inherent risks. The Watsu provider needs to constantly observe and analyze each movement for safety, especially in case of injury or illness where movement could cause harm, e.g., osteoporosis, acute rheumatoid arthritis, and ligamentous instability. Slow and smooth movement, without sudden loading of the joints, is generally advisable. Motion sickness, with dizziness, nausea, or disorientation from excess vestibular system stimulation can occasionally result and therapists are advised to watch for signs of overstimulation.

== See also ==
- Aquatic bodywork massage
- Waterdance
