= Bad Ragaz Ring Method =

- Specialty: Physical therapy

The Bad Ragaz Ring Method (BRRM) is a type of aquatic therapy used for physical rehabilitation based on proprioceptive neuromuscular facilitation (PNF). BRRM is a water-based technique in which therapist-assisted strengthening and mobilizing exercises are performed while the patient lies horizontally in the water, with support provided by rings or floats around the neck, arms, pelvis, and legs.

== Background ==
The Bad Ragaz Ring Method (BRRM), originally developed by physiotherapists in Bad Ragaz, Switzerland, is an aquatic therapy treatment approach that uses a water-based strengthening and mobilizing resistive exercise model. BRRM is based on proprioceptive neuromuscular facilitation (PNF). PNF is commonly used in physiotherapy to enhance both active and passive range of motion, with the ultimate goal being to improve neuromuscular function using patterns of movement and therapist-assisted resistance. Therapy is performed while floating horizontally in the water, with rings or floats supporting the neck, arms, pelvis, and knees. The extremities are used as levers to activate the trunk muscles.

Bad Ragaz Ring Method (BRRM) gets its name from the Bad Ragaz natural spring and wellness spa in eastern Switzerland. "Ring" refers to the rings or floats that are used to support the patient at the water surface. BRRM combines early techniques of aquatic exercise, developed in the 1930s by German physician Knupfer, with proprioceptive neuromuscular facilitation (PNF) techniques developed in the 1950s and 1960s by American neurophysiologist Herman Kabat and his assistants Margaret Knott and Dorothy Voss. Dr Knupfer originally adapted land exercises to water, using floats to support the patient while the therapist acts as a fixed point for movement. Knott and Voss applied PNF extensively for therapeutic exercise and began presenting their techniques in workshops in the 1950s; PNF courses began to be taught at major universities during the 1960s; and subsequently PNF became a widely accepted technique used extensively by physical therapists, other health professionals, and athletes. Adaptation of PNF for use in aquatic therapy took place between the early 1960s and 1990 at Bad Ragaz, initially by Dr W.M. Zinn and Nele Ipsen, and later by Bridget Davies and Beatrice Egger.

== Technique ==
BRRM involves an aquatic therapist working one-on-one to guide a patient through specific patterns of movement and resistance, with the effect of muscular elongation and relaxation and associated pain modulation, and with the goal of improving proprioception and neuromuscular functioning. The method uses various properties of water for therapy, in particular turbulence and resistance, to restore anatomical, biomechanical, and physiological movements of joints and muscles in functional patterns. As with land-based PNF, BRRM recruits weak muscles by overflow from strong muscles and stimulates sensory awareness to rehabilitate neuromuscular function. BRRM differs from land-based PNF in various technical details. In particular, on land the therapist moves around the patient and controls resistance; whereas in water, the therapist acts as a fixed point, while the patient controls' resistance by varying the speed of movement.

Neck, pelvis, arm, and leg rings or floats provide support and correct positioning as the patient lies supine in waist to shoulder-depth water. The therapist stands with hips and knees slightly flexed and guides the patient through specific exercises. Exercises are focused on increasing joint range of motion, increasing mobility of neural and myofascial tissues, and improving muscle function.

== Applications ==
Therapeutic applications include orthopaedic and rheumatology conditions (e.g., rheumatoid arthritis, spondylosis, osteoarthritis, including pre- and postsurgery, fibromyalgia, and ankylosing spondylitis); post fracture (e.g., spine, pelvis and lower limb); soft tissue injuries; thoracic or breast surgery; and neurological conditions (e.g., cerebrovascular accident, spinal injury, Parkinson’s disease, head injury).
