= Core stability =

Ability of a person to control the position and movement of their torso

In kinesiology, core stability is a person's ability to stabilize their core (all parts of the body that are not limbs). Stability, in this context, should be considered as an ability to control the tone, position and movement of the core. Thus, if a person has greater core stability, they have a greater level of control over the position and movement of this area of their body. The body's core is frequently involved in aiding other movements of the body, such as running; thus, it is known that improving core stability also improves a person's ability to perform these other movements.

The body's core region consists of the head, neck and torso (or trunk), although there are some differences in the muscles identified as constituting them. The major muscles involved in core stability, i.e. core muscles, include the pelvic floor muscles, transversus abdominis, multifidus, internal and external obliques, rectus abdominis, erector spinae (sacrospinalis) especially the longissimus thoracis, and the diaphragm. Notably, breathing, including the action of the diaphragm, can significantly influence the posture and movement of the core; this is especially apparent in regard to extreme ranges of inhalation and exhalation. On this basis, how a person is breathing may influence their ability to control their core.

Some researchers have argued that the generation of intra-abdominal pressure, caused by the activation of the core muscles and especially the transversus abdominis, may serve to lend support to the lumbar spine. One way in which intra-abdominal pressure can be increased is by the adoption of a deeper breathing pattern. In this case, and as considered by Hans Lindgren, 'The diaphragm [...] performs its breathing function at a lower position to facilitate a higher IAP.' Thus, the adoption of a deeper breathing pattern may improve core stability.

Typically, the core is associated with the body's center of gravity (COG). In the 'standard anatomical position' the COG is identified as being anterior to the second sacral vertebrae. However, the precise location of a person's COG changes with every movement they make. Michael Yessis argues that it is the lumbar spine that is primarily responsible for posture and stability, and thus provides the strength and stability required for dynamic sports.

== In practice ==
Whenever a person moves, to lift something or simply to move from one position to another, the core region is tensed first. This tension is usually made unconsciously and in conjunction with a change in breathing pattern. An example to try is to sit in a chair and to reach forward over a table to pick up a cup. This movement is first accompanied by a tension in the core region of the abdomen and can be felt by placing one hand on the abdomen as the movement is made.

As load increases, trunk muscles contract to raise intra-abdominal pressure around the relatively incompressible abdominal contents, contributing to spinal stability and force transmission in coordination with posture.

It is commonly believed that core stability is essential for the maintenance of an upright posture and especially for movements and lifts that require extra effort such as lifting a heavy weight from the ground to a table. Without core stability the lower back is not supported from inside and can be injured by strain caused by the exercise. It is also believed that insufficient core stability can result in lower back pain and lower limb injuries.

== Research ==
There is little support in research for the core stability model and many of the benefits attributed to this method of exercise have not been demonstrated. At best core stability training has the same benefits as general, non-specific exercise (see review by Lederman 09) and walking. Trunk or core specific exercise have failed to demonstrate preventative benefits against injuries in sports or to improve sports performance.

== Training methods ==
Training methods for developing and maintaining core stability include:

- Pilates
- Exercise ball, also known as a Swiss ball, stability ball, yoga ball, Pilates ball or fitness ball
- Yoga

== Exercise for strengthening of the cervical, thoracic and lumbar spine ==
The cervical, thoracic and lumbar spine is composed of a total of 24 presacral vertebrae and their main functions are to protect the spinal cord, provide an attachment site for many muscles of the body. They also function by distributing one's bodyweight when standing upright. Many injuries to the spine occur as a result of vehicle accidents, falling, and sports and recreation. While it is impossible to prevent such events from happening, increasing intra-abdominal pressure and strengthening the musculature in the back, along with keeping a neutral spine, can minimize injuries like hernias, strains, and sprains.

=== Intra-abdominal pressure ===
The correlation between having a significant amount of core strength and spinal health has been well documented by many studies in the past. Some of these studies were able to quantify the effects that antagonizing abdominal muscle had on stabilizing the lumbar spine by increasing the amount of intra-abdominal pressure in order to maintain a straight lumbar spine and to avoid rounding during physical activities, and using simple techniques such as the “Valsalva maneuver”. A simple exercise used to strengthen the abdominals (rectus abdominis, internal/external obliques, and transverse abdominis) is using the isometric or "static" hold known as the plank.

=== Strengthening back musculature ===
Simply by working to keep a neutral spine and remembering to increase intra-abdominal pressure before performing a movement that could compromise the spine, you are able to drastically decrease your risk for sustaining a back injury. If you were looking for ways to both strengthen and increase stability of the musculature of the spine one could perform various body weight exercises, for instance the bird dog exercise.

== See also ==
- Human abdomen
- Sit ups
- Running
