= Aquajogging =

Water Running

Aquajogging is a cross-training and rehabilitation method using low impact resistance training. It is a way to train without impacting joints. Participants wear a flotation device and move in a running motion in the deep end of a pool. Equipment, aside from a pool, can include a flotation belt and weights. It is useful in training for running because the muscles used are similar.

== General ==
Aquajogging can be practised in swimming pools but also in natural waters. Participants are up to their shoulders in the water, and can run or walk. A water belt tied around the swimmer's waist helps them stay afloat and upright. However, the water belt does not have the support of a lifejacket, so an unskilled swimmer needs supervision. In addition to the water belt, swimmers can wear ankle support, water gloves on their hands and water shoes on their feet.

Growing in popularity, aquajogging offers a way of moving around in the water for those who, for one reason or another, are not suited to traditional swimming. The waterbelt can be carried in the water in either an upright or traditional swimming position. It is particularly suitable for people with lower limb arthritis, neck and back pain, overweight people, people with disabilities, people with long-term illnesses, the elderly, children, summer training for open water swimmers, a wide range of rehabilitation needs and athletes for basic and compensatory training. In most cases, aquajogging is more suitable than swimming for people suffering from neck and shoulder tension, as many do not know the correct swimming techniques.
