= Hollywood Women's Political Committee =

Defunct political action committee

- Abbreviation: HWPC
- Formation: August 1984
- Dissolved: June 1997
- Type: PAC
- Legal status: defunct
- Headquarters: Beverly Hills, California
- Members: 300

Hollywood Women's Political Committee was an American political action committee that campaigned for progressive issues. The group was founded by Jane Fonda, Barbra Streisand, Susan Grode, and other women in the Greater Los Angeles area. HWPC formed in response to Geraldine Ferraro being selected as the running mate of Walter Mondale to run against President Ronald Reagan in the 1984 United States presidential election. The HWPC helped the Democratic Party wrest majority control in the 1986 U.S. Senate elections, and they helped elect Bill Clinton in the 1992 presidential election. 1992 also saw the HWPC assist in bringing a record number of women into the U.S. Senate, the accomplishment called the Year of the Woman.

Founded by 12 women, the membership grew to several hundred. In 1996 they were described as "the single most-powerful entertainment group" in politics, based on their total donations. The group disbanded in April 1997 after the rise of Clintonism: the centrist compromises made by Bill Clinton, abandoning HWPC and the Left. During its 12 years of operation, HWPC donated a total of $6 million for political causes.

== Background ==
Singer/actress Barbra Streisand had long been active in politics, taking part in the Women Strike for Peace of 1961, and helping the George McGovern 1972 presidential campaign by performing at the Four for McGovern concert. Actress/activist Jane Fonda and her husband, activist/politician Tom Hayden, created the Campaign for Economic Democracy (CED) in 1976 to fund Hayden's 1982 run for the California State Senate, and to champion progressive political causes. After Hayden won, CED promoted solar power, opposed nuclear power, and promoted women's rights; all paid for by Fonda's very popular workout book and videos.

== Foundation ==
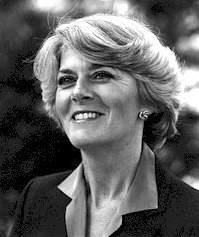
Geraldine Ferraro inspired HWPC to form

In 1984, President Ronald Reagan, strongly conservative, was running for reelection. In speeches, he referred to Hollywood as "my town" and "my people". A group of liberal women in Hollywood were vexed by Reagan's assumption that Hollywood was conservative, and they discussed ways of promoting the idea that Hollywood was strong in liberal politics. On July 12, 1984, Democratic Party presidential nominee Walter Mondale chose Geraldine Ferraro as his vice presidential running mate; she was the first female vice presidential candidate from a major political party. The Hollywood women were catalyzed into action to support her campaign. They filed papers in August to form the Hollywood Women's Political Committee, raising $750,000 for the Mondale–Ferraro ticket.

From 12 original members, the HWPC grew to 70 women in 1987, 140 in 1988, 200 women in 1990 and 300 in 1996. Older members paid $1,500 yearly, while those under 30 paid $500. A majority of the members were younger than 45. Men were not allowed to join but they could attend public meetings. A policy committee of 14 members determined the group agenda. Activist Margery Tabankin ran HWPC; she was later appointed by Streisand as executive director of the Barbra Streisand Foundation, holding both positions. In 1994 when filmmaker Steven Spielberg appointed Tabankin to his Oskar Schindler Foundation, she stayed with the Streisand Foundation but resigned from the HWPC, handing the reins to Lara Bergthold.

== Campaigns ==
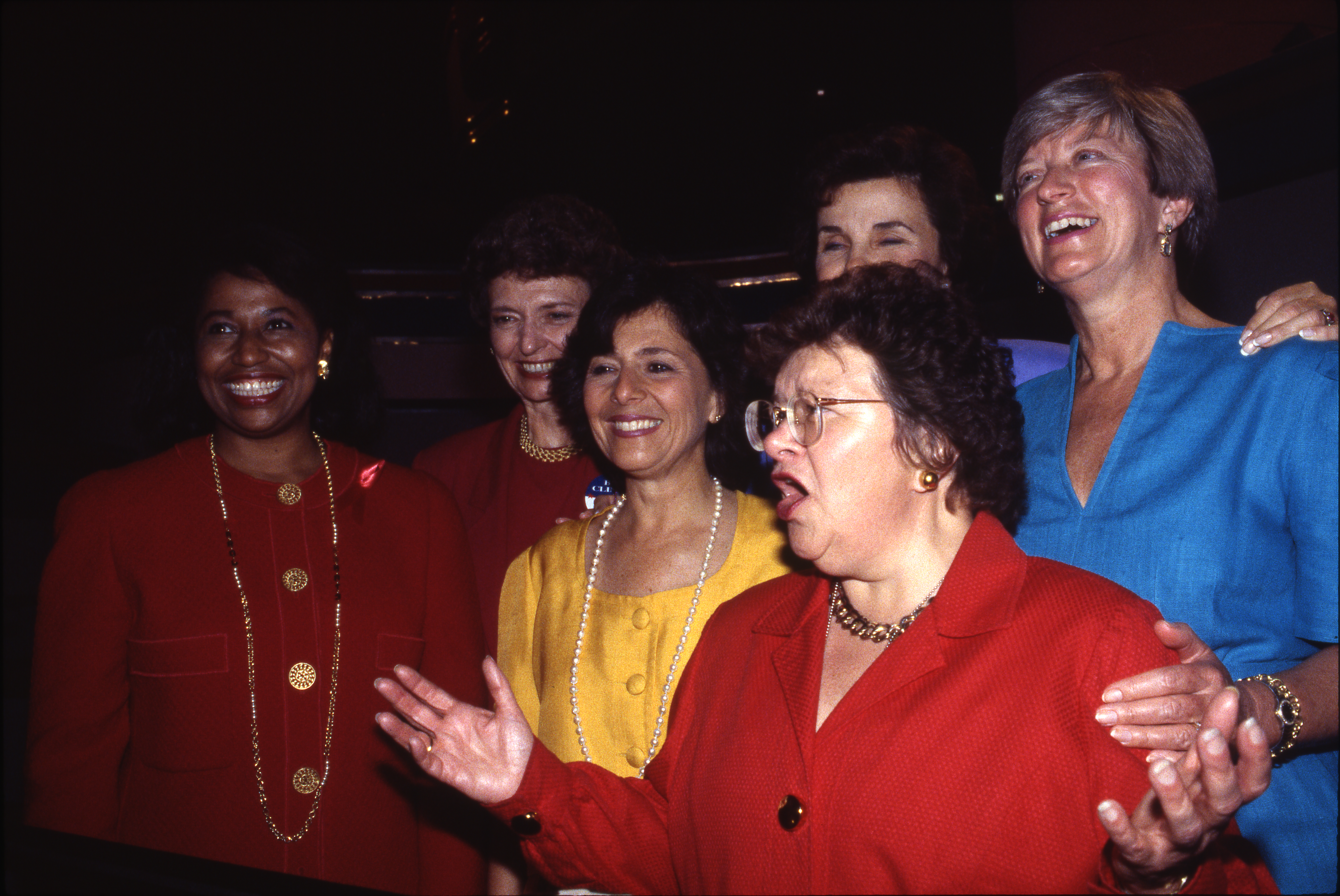
1992 Year of the Woman. Five U.S. Senate candidates stand behind Senator Barbara Mikulski. From left: Carol Moseley-Braun, Jean Hall Lloyd-Jones, Barbara Boxer, Dianne Feinstein, Patty Murray.

After Mondale–Ferraro lost to Reagan–Bush, the HWPC felt that Mondale had not moved far enough to the left, and had failed to engage or excite liberal voters. They decided to declare a strong New Left stance. The HWPC drew up a list of principles in early 1985, determining which political issues were to be the focus. They included abortion rights, nuclear weapons freeze, anti-nuclear power, anti-pollution, and more. Though Fonda was not involved in day-to-day operations, her influence was felt. Bergthold noticed in 1992 when she joined the group that many of the staffers had previous experience working on political campaigns with Fonda and Hayden. And the issues pursued by CED were many of the same confronting HWPC, especially the HWPC policy statement, "We are committed to an economic policy based on every citizen's full participation in our country's economic wealth."

HWPC decided to fund six Democratic challengers in the 1986 Senate races, in an effort to take majority control of the Senate. Streisand and the HWPC held a fund-raising benefit concert at Streisand's Malibu home in September 1986, raising a surprising $1.5 million for the six close races. Five of the six were elected, and with other wins, the Democratic Party became the majority party in Congress, serving as a counterbalance to Reagan's policies.

Typically, the HWPC backed the issues more than individual candidates; they were not pragmatic political players who would easily compromise. They wanted hard proof of a politician's commitment to their principles, and they did not accept promises without action. But in 1986 they began looking at potential Democratic Party presidential candidates to run in 1988, and they narrowed the field to Senator Joe Biden from Delaware, and Senator Gary Hart from Colorado. Hart was briefly the frontrunner but his campaign was sunk by revelations of his womanizing. Biden dropped out after charges of plagiarism in his speeches. The Democratic Convention settled on Michael Dukakis, who lost to George H. W. Bush.

In 1992 to help implement the Year of the Woman, HWPC donated almost $200,000 to the campaigns of Dianne Feinstein and Barbara Boxer to assist them in winning the special election and the regular U.S. Senate election in California, respectively. This was the first time both U.S. senators from one state were women. In July 1992 at the Regent Beverly Wilshire Hotel, the HWPC hosted a fundraising dinner for nine women candidates running for U.S. Senate. Lily Tomlin was master of ceremonies, and Streisand delivered the keynote speech, saying, "It’s time we had a place at the table where the life and death decisions of the country, the world and the planet are made." HWPC co-founder Marilyn Bergman composed a song for the dinner with Marvin Hamlisch; "Common Threads" was performed by a chorus of HWPC singers, and women from the First African Methodist Episcopal Church. Tomlin joked, "The last time we celebrated the Year of the Woman was 72 years ago when women got the vote. Boy, time sure flies when you’re being oppressed." A total of $375,000 was raised for the nine candidates.

In 1994, the HWPC spent $10,000 to oppose two anti-gay bills in other states, Oregon's Ballot Measure 13, and a similar one in Idaho. These efforts were victorious, unlike the funding of Rick Zbur's campaign during the 1996 U.S. House of Representatives elections in California. Zbur, running as an openly gay man, won his Democratic primary but lost to the Republican incumbent. Bergthold said that HWPC's gay-friendly position on LGBT issues was based on the group's established stance regarding civil rights in general.

In January 1996, the HWPC "went cyber" by establishing a webpage, which was unusual for the time. Even so, they still kept their fax machines to pass information to politicians.

== Breakup ==
Bill Clinton speaks on welfare reform. His 1996 turn away from the New Left was a blow to HWPC.

The HWPC suffered a setback in 1994 when years' worth of New Left advances were swept aside in a rightward turn led by Newt Gingrich's Contract with America. The HWPC raised $4 million for the successful 1996 campaign to reelect President Bill Clinton, but a number of HWPC members were unhappy with his policies. Clinton had just signed the Personal Responsibility and Work Opportunity Act, a gesture of mollification to Gingrich and others on the right who were urging welfare reform. The new laws hurt low income women disproportionately, a fact which angered many in the HWPC. In various other ways, Clinton was signaling a further shift to the right which would later be described as Clintonism. The HWPC convened discussion groups about this problem, and no consensus emerged for a solution. They voted to disband in April 1997, fulfilling contractual obligations through the end of June when they finally closed their doors.

During its heyday, HWPC was seen as "the most dominant political force in Hollywood," according to political strategist Andy Spahn. Spahn said the women of the PAC "were certainly a counterforce to the right. They held the candidate's feet to the fire. They provided pressure to keep them on the left."

== Principles ==
- "We are committed to the absolute right and prerogative of women to economic equality, personal choice, and full participation in and benefits of citizenship of the United States. We oppose any attempt, legislative or otherwise, to interfere with a woman's absolute ownership and control of her own body."
- "We are committed to the enforcement of civil rights laws and protection of civil liberties through adherence to the Civil Rights Act and Affirmative Action. We challenge any attempt to erode or weaken such laws or protections."
- "We are committed to the belief that the ultimate defense of the United States of America lies in the immediate dismantling of the global nuclear war machine."
- "We are committed to an Independent Judiciary – a judiciary responsible to the Constitution, not to the prevailing political winds."
- "We are committed to preserving and protecting life on this planet – the food we eat, the air we breathe, and the water we drink. It is time to expose and penalize as criminals those who knowingly destroy the balance of nature."
- "We are committed to the responsible use of economical, military, and political power throughout the world. We will actively oppose all government support of any country that violates the human rights of its citizens. We are committed to the pursuit of self-determination for all nations."
- "We are committed to reversing the failure of our society to provide for and educate our young and provide for and care for our old."
- "We are committed to an economic policy based on every citizen's full participation in our country's economic wealth. We believe that concern for the quality of life must be a national mandate. We are opposed to perpetuating the myth of a balanced budget as an excuse to dismantle the social agenda of this country."
- "We are committed to the separation of religion and politics. We recognize as a threat to our fundamental democratic institutions any confusion of piety and patriotism."

== Notable members ==
- Rosanna Arquette, actress
- Patti Austin, singer-songwriter
- Roseanne Barr, actress, comedian
- Marilyn Bergman, songwriter
- Kate Capshaw, actress
- Judy Collins, singer-songwriter
- Barbara Corday, president of Columbia Pictures
- Geena Davis, actress
- Dana Delany, actress, activist
- Laura Dern, actress
- Patricia Duff, activist
- Faye Dunaway, actress
- Shelley Fabares, actress, singer
- Morgan Fairchild, actress
- Jane Fonda, actress
- Daryl Hannah, actress
- Goldie Hawn, actress
- Melissa Manchester, singer-songwriter
- Penny Marshall, actress, director, producer
- Sarah Jessica Parker, actress
- Ally Sheedy, actress
- Cybill Shepherd, actress
- Dawn Steel, chairman of Columbia Pictures
- Mary Steenburgen, actress
- Barbra Streisand, singer, actress, director
- Anthea Sylbert, film producer
- Margery Tabankin, activist
- Marlo Thomas, actress
- Lily Tomlin, actress, comedian
- Dionne Warwick, singer
- Paula Weinstein, film and television producer
- Vanessa Williams, singer
