= Andy Spahn =

American political activist

Andy J. Spahn (born July 27, 1953) is an American political activist, consultant and Democratic Party fundraiser. He is the political advisor to DreamWorks founders Steven Spielberg, David Geffen and Jeffrey Katzenberg.

From his beginnings as a radical anti-war and anti-apartheid activist in California, Spahn advanced in the 1980s to direct Tom Hayden's Campaign for Economic Democracy. In the 1990s, Spahn was the president of Norman Lear's Environmental Media Association, the David Geffen Foundation, and a corporate executive at DreamWorks. Spahn founded his own strategic consulting firm in 2006 and was active in the President's Committee on the Arts and Humanities during the Obama Administration. In 2017, he was called "Hollywood’s leading fundraising consultant to the powerful".

== Activism ==
Spahn's first political activism was against the U.S. war in Vietnam at the age of 18. He was a draft resister, refusing to register his name for Selective Service, and he spoke to motivate others to resist. He dropped out of college for a year or two, which was an experience he said he would not have traded, but for which he paid a price professionally. As a college junior at UC Berkeley in mid-1977, Spahn joined the newly formed activist group Campuses United Against Apartheid (CUAA). He traveled California telling university students how corporations divesting from South Africa could be used as a weapon against state-sanctioned apartheid. Spahn wrote an article, "Reinvestment", describing the extent that the University of California was investing in South Africa through its stocks, bonds and investments portfolio which put $792 million into multi-national corporations that did business in South Africa. Spahn proposed the UC system reallocate its investments to small businesses in California. Spahn also spoke against institutional racism and for affirmative action, referencing the ongoing Bakke case. In 1978–79, Spahn founded the Berkeley-based Students for Economic and Racial Justice (SERJ), an anti-apartheid group collaborating with CUAA, and he was a vice president of the Associated Students of the University of California. Spahn graduated from the University of California, Berkeley.

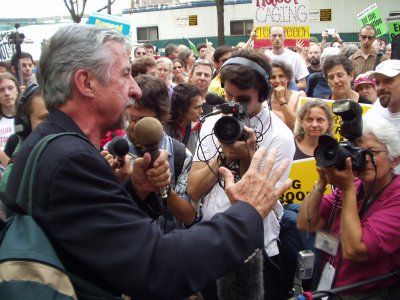
Tom Hayden in 2004

In 1976, Spahn went to work for Tom Hayden's unsuccessful campaign for U.S. Senate in California. Following this, he worked with Hayden and Hayden's wife, Jane Fonda, in the mid-to-late 1970s as political director of their activist group, Campaign for Economic Democracy. In 1983, Spahn assisted the Democratic Party primary campaign of Senator Alan Cranston for president, which petered out in early 1984. Picking up from there, Spahn created the Democratic Entertainment Industry Project to coordinate fundraising efforts in Hollywood aimed to fight against Ronald Reagan's reelection run in that year's presidential election. The DEIP, which was funded by the three major national democratic committees, and was part of the Hayden–Fonda circle of influence, employed Spahn to shepherd Hollywood talent around the country in support of Walter Mondale's campaign for president, and other democratic House and Senate candidates. This effort helped to birth in August 1984 the Hollywood Women's Political Committee.

Working in Washington D.C. for a few years, Spahn served on campaign committees for Senator George Mitchell and Tony Coelho, where he worked alongside Rahm Emanuel. He was the national finance director for presidential candidate Gary Hart in 1987, but Hart dropped out when reports revealed his marital infidelity. Spahn said that Hart's fall was a tragedy for the 1988 election: "Hart came from progressive politics... he was going to be the first of our generation to be elected president. We believed he was better prepared to govern" than other candidates in the race.

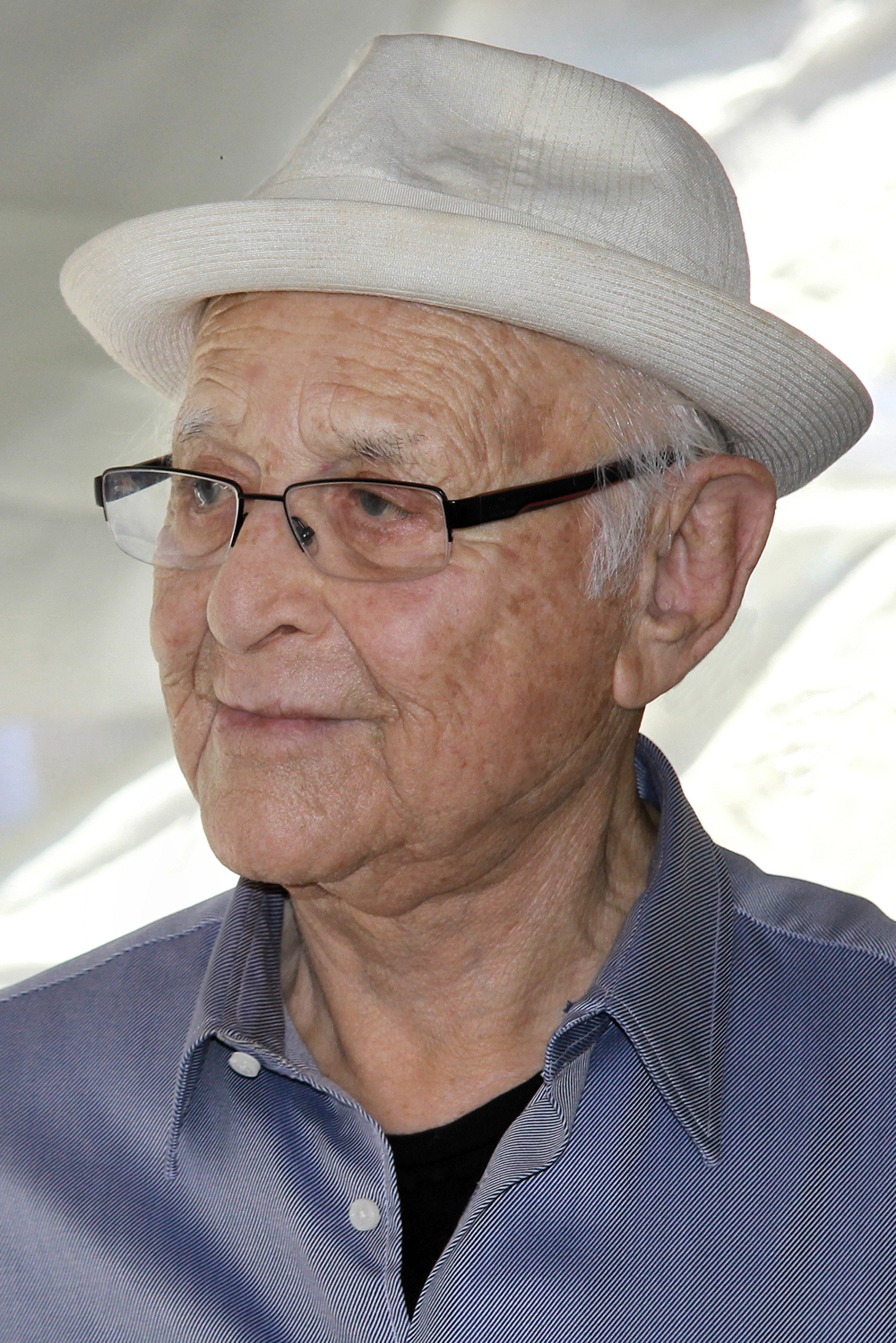
Norman Lear in 2014

In April 1989, Spahn helped build Norman Lear's Environmental Media Association, to promote environmental issues by integrating them into the storylines of television programs. Spahn served as president. Spahn said the EMA "hopes to generate a climate of concern about our environment and give creative expression to the vision of a healthy future for the planet." Environmental issues were worked into television episode plots centrally or peripherally. The change could be as little as characters carpooling or recycling, or whole episode themes might be devoted to the topic, such as Thirtysomething's main character Hope becoming an activist against pollution.

== Geffen and DreamWorks ==
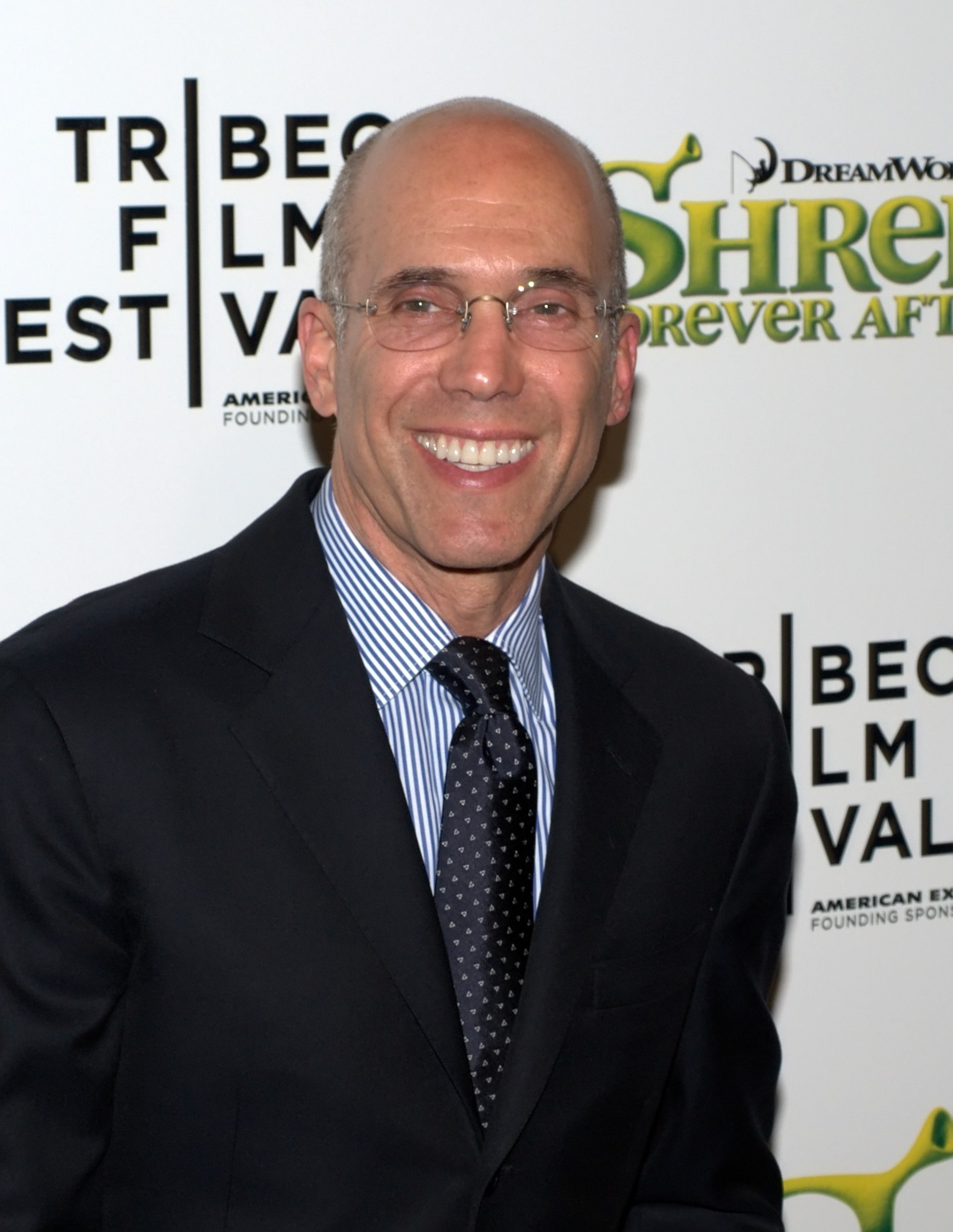
Jeffrey Katzenberg consults with Spahn

In April 1993, music and film producer David Geffen tapped Spahn for the role of vice president of corporate affairs at The Geffen Company. The next year, David Geffen joined with film producer Steven Spielberg and ex-Disney president Jeffrey Katzenberg to create DreamWorks SKG. At the beginning of 1995, Spahn began serving as head of Corporate Affairs at DreamWorks. Spahn guided DreamWorks' political donations during this period, including their fundraising efforts toward Bill Clinton's 1996 reelection and Al Gore's run for the 2000 U.S. presidential election. Spahn was described as the "gatekeeper" to the trio of Geffen, Katzenberg and Spielberg, handling thousands of donation requests every year from individuals and groups seeking monetary support. While Spahn passed along certain meritorious requests, he necessarily said "no" thousands of times.

== Independent consultant ==
In March 2006, Spahn founded Andy Spahn & Associates to advise high net worth individuals, corporations and nonprofits on how best to advance their interests and causes. His top associate and co-founder was Jennifer Gonring who joined from DreamWorks.

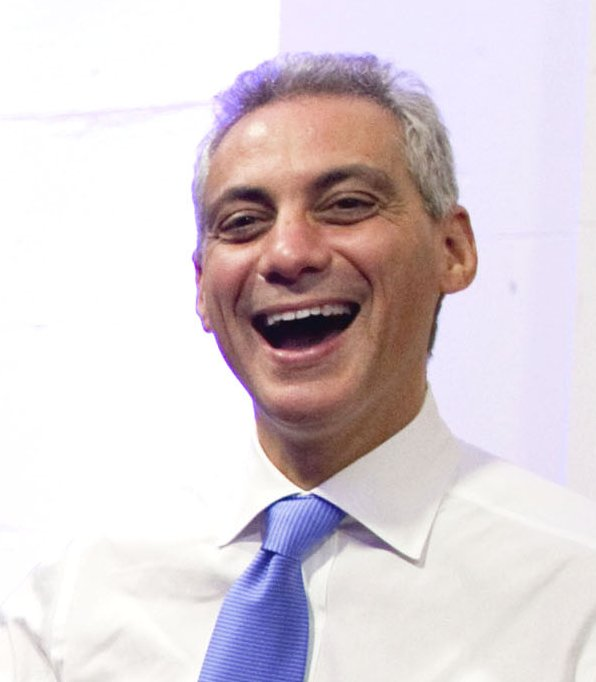
Rahm Emanuel introduced Spahn to Barack Obama

Rahm Emanuel introduced Spahn to Barack Obama. Moved by Obama's political potential, Spahn introduced him to Spielberg, Katzenberg and Geffen, a connection that led to key support for Obama from the Hollywood community. Spahn organized a fundraising event for Obama in February 2007 hosted by the DreamWorks trio, ending with a smaller dinner at Geffen's home; an estimated $1.5 million was raised for Obama in one night. After Obama was elected, Katzenberg and Spahn visited the White House many times. Spahn was listed as a bundler for Obama, and he served on the President's Committee on the Arts and Humanities.

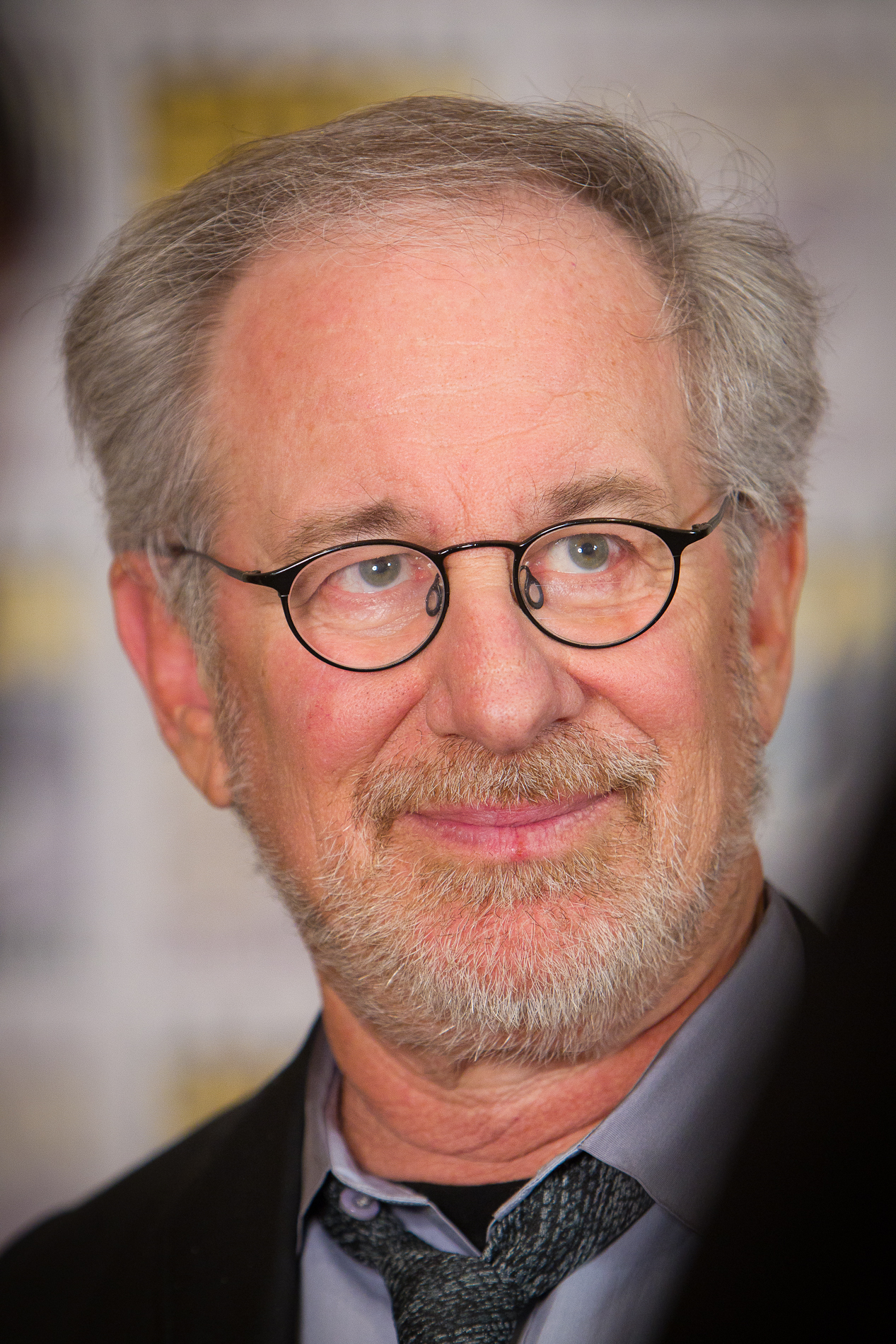
Steven Spielberg spoke through Spahn about Darfur

During 2007–2008, Spahn advised Spielberg on the political ramifications of the Chinese invitation for Spielberg to help filmmaker Zhang Yimou produce the opening and closing ceremonies of the 2008 Summer Olympics in Beijing, China. China had been reported funding the Sudanese military's Darfur genocide in the western region of Sudan, and the news hit Spielberg personally after a March 2007 editorial piece in The Wall Street Journal written by Mia Farrow and her son Ronan. The Farrows compared Spielberg to Hitler's filmmaker Leni Riefenstahl in their piece "The Genocide Olympics". Spahn advised Spielberg that he was in a position of leverage, that he could try and shift China away from their harmful activities in Sudan. Spielberg decided to write the Chinese Prime Minister to urge China to stop providing support for Sudan's activities in Sudan. In response, diplomat Zhai Jun toured refugee camps in Darfur, an unusual step for China. In July 2007, with pressure from Spielberg and from Mia Farrow's Dream for Darfur campaign, China reversed their stance and supported a U.N. resolution to send 26,000 peacekeeping soldiers to Darfur. But Sudan stalled, blocking the U.N. entry, making conditional demands, and Spahn recommended Spielberg continue to apply pressure, which he did in November 2007 with another letter. China failed to break the Sudanese obstruction, so in February 2008, Spielberg resigned from the Olympics.

In the 2000s, Spahn visited Cuba several times to gauge the country's political and cultural climate, and he coordinated Spielberg's visit to Havana in November 2002, calling for a lifting of the U.S. trade embargo against Cuba. In 2009, the issue was raised again after Obama called for better relations with Cuba. Spahn criticized Senator Bob Menendez for holding up comprehensive national legislation which would ease trade between the two nations. Later that year, Carlos Varela, "Cuba's Bob Dylan", visited Washington, D.C., and he attended a dinner organized by Spahn. Spahn said, "Everyone who has gone to Cuba comes out questioning our policy because what they see there is nothing like what they have been told by American politicians." Spahn called for the release of the Cuban Five in 2010 and 2011. In late 2014, Obama pushed further to start the Cuban thaw, and when the president himself visited Cuba in March 2016, Spahn was there with him. After WikiLeaks published John Podesta's emails in 2016, Spahn was speculated as a choice for Hillary Clinton's ambassador to Cuba. However, when Donald Trump won the election in 2016, all of Clinton's cabinet hopefuls were left behind.

Spahn promoted co-founder Gonring to partner and CEO in 2014, changing the company name to Gonring Spahn, then in early 2020 he promoted ex-DreamWorks Jennifer Lin to partner, the firm now operating as Gonring Lin Spahn. The company continues to guide philanthropy, communications, and government affairs efforts for private and public clients, and they bundle millions of dollars for Democratic Party candidates.

== Personal life ==
Spahn lives in Brentwood, Los Angeles, with his wife Jennifer L. Perry. In 1994, Spahn attended the wedding of Rahm Emanuel, who was at Spahn's own wedding.
