= Jeffrey Katzenberg =

American film producer and media proprietor (born 1950)

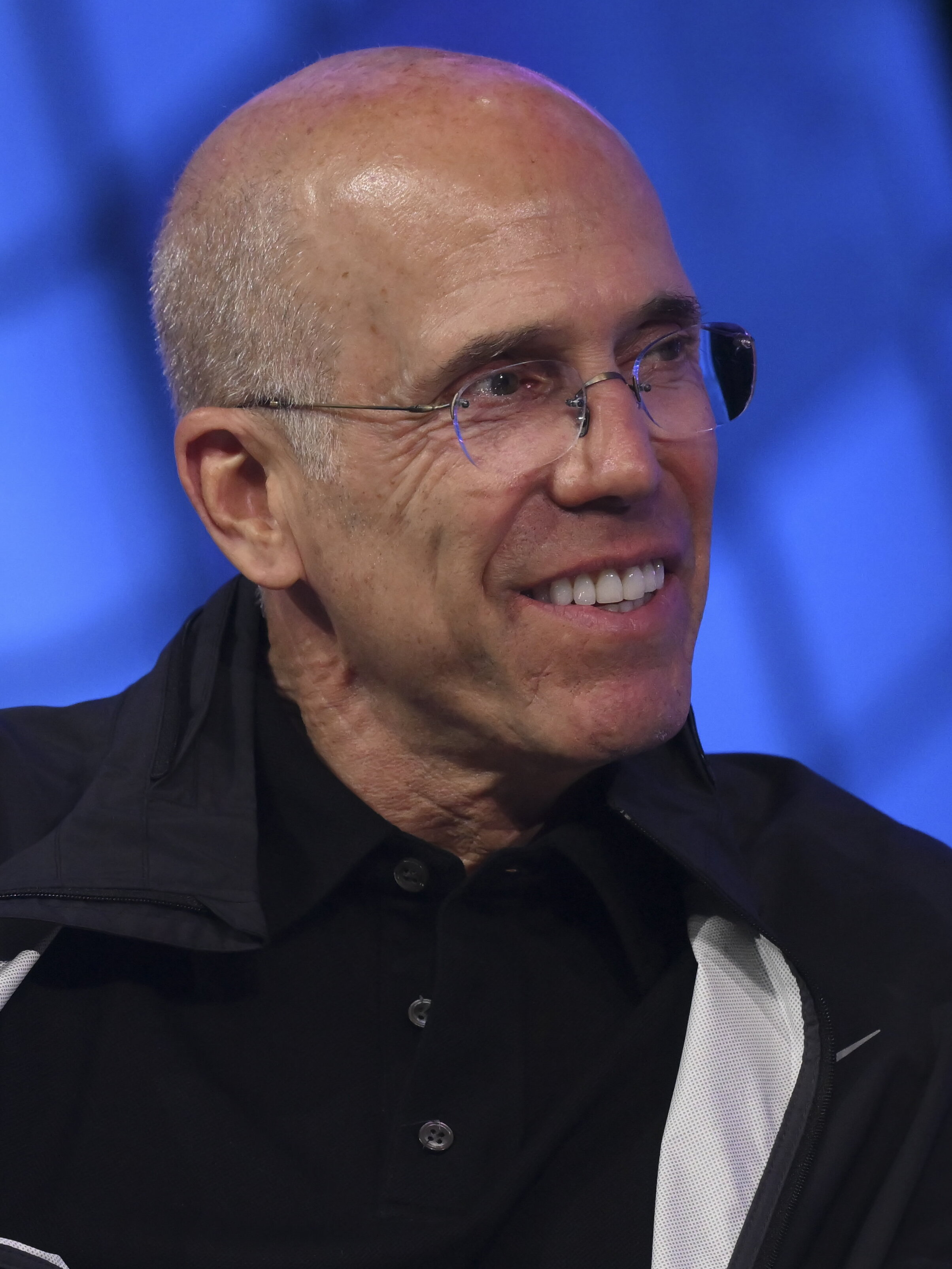
- Katzenberg in 2022
- Born: December 21, 1950 (age 75); New York City, U.S.
- Occupations: Media proprietor; film producer
- Years active: 1979–present
- Organization: WndrCo
- Notable work: Who Framed Roger Rabbit; The Little Mermaid; Beauty and the Beast; Aladdin; The Lion King; American Beauty; The Prince of Egypt; Shrek; Kung Fu Panda; How to Train Your Dragon
- Title: Co-founder of Hollywood Pictures, DreamWorks Pictures, DreamWorks Animation and WndrCo; Former CEO of DreamWorks Animation and DreamWorks Records; Founder of Quibi
- Political party: Democratic
- Spouse: Marilyn Siegel (m. 1975)
- Children: 2

Jeffrey Katzenberg (/ˈkætsənbɜːrɡ/ KAT-sən-burg; born December 21, 1950) is an American media proprietor and film producer. He served as chairman of Walt Disney Studios from 1984 to 1994, during which time he oversaw production for the company's feature films. Following his departure, he co-founded DreamWorks SKG in 1994, (Note: Katzenberg represents the K in DreamWorks SKG.) where he served as the company's chief executive officer (CEO) and executive producer of its animated franchises—including Shrek, Madagascar, Kung Fu Panda, and How to Train Your Dragon—until stepping down from the title in 2016. He has since founded the venture capital firm WndrCo in the same year, which invests in digital media projects, and launched Quibi in 2020, a defunct short-form mobile video platform that lost US$1.35 billion in seven months.

Katzenberg is also a prominent election donor for the Democratic Party. With active support of Hillary Clinton and Barack Obama, he was named "one of Hollywood's premier political kingmakers and […] top national fund-raisers". He was a campaign co-chair for Joe Biden's 2024 presidential re-election campaign, and subsequently Kamala Harris's 2024 presidential campaign.

== Early life and education ==
Katzenberg was born on December 21, 1950, in New York City, to a Jewish family, the son of Anne, an artist, and Walter Katzenberg, a stockbroker. He attended the Ethical Culture Fieldston School, graduating in 1969. When he was 14, Katzenberg volunteered to work on John Lindsay's successful New York mayoral campaign. He quickly received the nickname "Squirt" and attended as many meetings as he could. He went on to attend New York University for one year, before dropping out to work full-time as an advance man for Lindsay.

== Professional career ==
=== Paramount Pictures ===
Katzenberg began his career as an assistant to producer David V. Picker, then in 1974 he became an assistant to Barry Diller, the chairman of Paramount Pictures. Diller moved Katzenberg to the marketing department, followed by other assignments within the studio, until he was assigned to revive the Star Trek franchise, which resulted in Star Trek: The Motion Picture. He continued to work his way up and became president of production under Paramount's president, Michael Eisner, overseeing the production of films including 48 Hrs., Terms of Endearment, and Indiana Jones and the Temple of Doom.

=== The Walt Disney Studios ===
In 1984, Eisner became chief executive officer (CEO) of the Walt Disney Company. Eisner brought Katzenberg with him to serve as chairman of the Walt Disney Studios. As head of the studio, he oversaw all filmed content including motion pictures, television, Disney Channel, and home video distribution. Katzenberg was responsible for reviving the studio which, at the time, ranked last at the box office among the major studios. He focused the studio on the production of adult-oriented comedies through its Touchstone Pictures banner, including films such as Down and Out in Beverly Hills, Three Men and a Baby, Good Morning, Vietnam, Dead Poets Society, and Pretty Woman. By 1987, Disney had become the number-one studio at the box office. Katzenberg expanded Disney's film portfolio by launching Hollywood Pictures with Eisner and overseeing the acquisition of Miramax Films in 1993. Katzenberg also oversaw Touchstone Television, which produced television series such as The Golden Girls, Empty Nest and Home Improvement.

Katzenberg was also charged with turning around Disney's ailing Feature Animation unit. Shortly after joining the company, he created some intrastudio controversy when he personally edited a few minutes out of a completed Disney animated feature, The Black Cauldron (1985), while also delaying its release. Under his management, the animation department eventually began creating some of Disney's most critically acclaimed and highest grossing animated features. These films include The Great Mouse Detective (1986), Who Framed Roger Rabbit (1988), Oliver & Company (1988), The Little Mermaid (1989), The Rescuers Down Under (1990), Beauty and the Beast (1991)—which was the first animated feature to be nominated for an Academy Award for Best Picture—Aladdin (1992), The Lion King (1994), and Pocahontas (1995). Katzenberg also brokered a deal with Pixar to produce 3D computer-generated animated films, and greenlit production of their first film Toy Story.

Concerns arose internally at Disney, particularly from Eisner and Roy E. Disney, about Katzenberg taking too much credit for the success of Disney's animated releases. In 1993, Katzenberg discussed with Eisner the possibility of being promoted to president of the company, which would mean moving Frank Wells from president to vice chairman. Eisner responded that Wells would feel "hurt" in that scenario and then, according to Katzenberg, assured him that he would get the job if Wells vacated the position. After Wells died in a helicopter crash in 1994, Eisner assumed his duties instead of promoting Katzenberg. In an interview with The Hollywood Reporter, Eisner said that Roy Disney, Walt Disney's nephew and an influential member of the Disney board, did not like Katzenberg and threatened to start a proxy fight if Katzenberg was promoted to president. Tensions between Katzenberg, Eisner and Disney resulted in Katzenberg leaving Disney upon conclusion of his work contract with the company in October 1994. Disney board member Stanley Gold said Katzenberg had been brought low by "his ego and almost pathological need to be important". Katzenberg sued Disney for money he asserted he was owed, and settled out of court for an estimated $250 million in 1999.

=== DreamWorks SKG ===
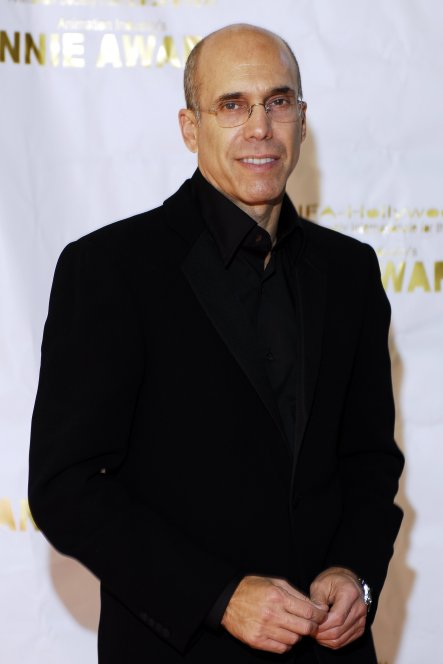
Katzenberg at the 34th Annie Awards

Later in 1994, Katzenberg co-founded DreamWorks SKG with Steven Spielberg and David Geffen, with Katzenberg taking primary responsibility for animation operations. He was also credited as producer or executive producer on the DreamWorks animated films The Prince of Egypt (1998), The Road to El Dorado, Chicken Run and Joseph: King of Dreams (all in 2000), Shrek in 2001, Spirit: Stallion of the Cimarron in 2002, Sinbad: Legend of the Seven Seas in 2003 and both Shrek 2 and Shark Tale in 2004.

After DreamWorks Animation suffered a $125 million loss on the traditionally animated Sinbad: Legend of the Seven Seas (2003), Katzenberg believed that telling traditional stories using traditional animation was a thing of the past, and the studio switched to all computer-generated animation, though some of their films would have some small 2D animated sequences. Since then, most of DreamWorks' animated feature films have been successful financially and critically with several Annie Awards and Academy Awards nominations and wins.

=== DreamWorks Animation ===
In 2004, DreamWorks Animation (DWA) was spun off from DreamWorks as a separate company headed by Katzenberg. DWA held an initial public offering that same year in conjunction with the spinoff which raised more than $812 million.

The live-action DreamWorks movie studio was sold to Viacom in December 2005. Then in 2008, DreamWorks Pictures entered into a new agreement to begin distributing its live-action films through Universal Pictures in 2009.

In 2006, Katzenberg made an appearance on the fifth season of The Apprentice. He awarded the task winners an opportunity to be character voices in Over the Hedge.

Katzenberg has been an industry leader in promoting digital 3D production of film, calling it "the greatest advance in the film industry since the arrival of color in the 1930s." When Katzenberg appeared on The Colbert Report on April 20, 2010, he confirmed that from now on "every single movie" that DreamWorks Animation produced would be in 3D and gave Stephen Colbert a pair of new 3D glasses.

NBCUniversal acquired DWA in 2016 for $3.8 billion. Katzenberg left his position as CEO of DWA and was named chairman of DreamWorks New Media (DWN), consisting of DWA's interests in AwesomenessTV and Nova. By January 2017, Katzenberg had stepped down from his position with DWN. In February 2017, NBCUniversal acquired a minority stake in Amblin Partners, the new parent company of the live-action DreamWorks studio since 2015, which reunited a minority percentage of the live-action DreamWorks label with its former animation division.

=== WndrCo ===
In January 2017, the LA Times reported that Katzenberg had raised funds for a new media and technology investment firm called WndrCo.

=== Quibi ===
In late 2018, Katzenberg announced his new video streaming platform, Quibi, created in partnership with former eBay CEO Meg Whitman. The platform specialized in original, short-form content designed for smartphones. Whitman was hired as the company's CEO and first employee. Katzenberg and Whitman created Quibi as a mobile-based Netflix. Their investors included Disney, NBCUniversal, 21st Century Fox, Sony, Viacom, and AT&T's newly rebranded WarnerMedia.

In late 2020, Quibi shut down after just over six months of operation. Katzenberg said the shutdown was due to a sudden change in how audiences consume media caused by the coronavirus pandemic which did not align with Quibi's market niche as well as a desire to return some funds to investors. Of the initial $1.65 billion raised, Katzenberg said he was able to return $600 million to investors. To lift Quibi employees' spirits, The Wall Street Journal reported that Katzenberg told them to listen to "Get Back Up Again" from the movie Trolls during a video call announcing the company's closure.

== Political activities ==
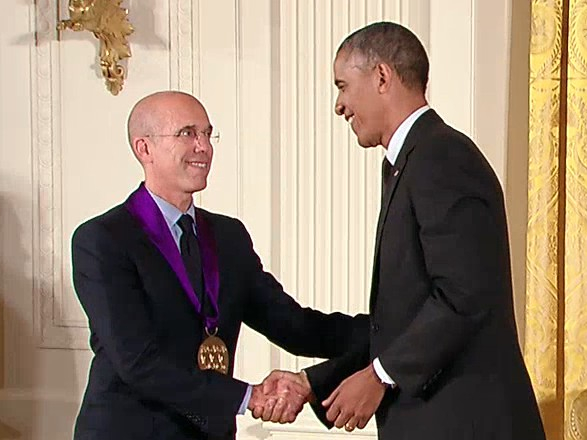
United States President Barack Obama presenting the 2013 National Medal of Arts to Katzenberg

Katzenberg has been a prominent supporter of Democratic candidates for elected office since the Clinton administration and was an early supporter of Barack Obama. Reportedly "smitten" by Obama's speech at the 2004 Democratic National Convention, Katzenberg pledged his full support to Obama in 2006 if he decided to run for president. During his campaign, Obama praised Katzenberg for his "tenacious support and advocacy since we started back in 2007."

Katzenberg was an avid fundraiser for Obama, doing so while much of Hollywood was still supporting the Clintons. The Wall Street Journal reported his efforts allowed Katzenberg to become an "informal liaison" between Hollywood and the Obama administration. Katzenberg was reportedly Obama's top "bundler", and, with Andy Spahn, had collected at least $6.6 million in combined donations for both of Obama's presidential campaigns. In 2012, Katzenberg organized a fundraiser for Obama's 2012 presidential campaign at the residence of George Clooney. The event reportedly set a record for presidential fundraisers, garnering approximately $15 million. Some Obama campaign officials were unhappy with some of Katzenberg's requests, including that Obama stay and talk with guests at each of the 14 tables at the dinner.

In 2012, the Securities and Exchange Commission reportedly opened an investigation into DreamWorks and other movie studios for bribing foreign officials. It was opened after the announcements of a deal between China and the United States to increase the number of American movies released in China and the launch of Oriental DreamWorks, a Chinese offshoot of DreamWorks Animation. News of the investigation broke shortly after Katzenberg assisted Joe Biden with brokering the Chinese movie deal and Katzenberg had held a fundraiser for the Obama campaign. The timing of the events led Washington Post columnist Jennifer Rubin to question if the deal and fundraiser were related. Katzenberg denied the existence of the investigation, saying that DreamWorks had never been asked for documents or to otherwise cooperate with an investigation.

In October 2012, Obama and Bill Clinton reportedly visited Katzenberg at his home in Beverly Hills for a private meeting with wealthy Democratic donors. The Obama campaign said the meeting was to thank supporters, but some members of the campaign finance committee said that it involved the pro-Obama political action committee Priorities USA Action. Members of the White House press corps who had traveled to California with Obama were kept in the garage of Katzenberg's mansion and one reporter called the meeting "unusual". Katzenberg, who had previously donated $2 million to Priorities USA Action, donated an additional $1 million to the PAC that month. Katzenberg donated $1 million to Priorities USA Action in 2015, which supported Hillary Clinton in the 2016 presidential race. In October 2016, he hosted a $100,000-per-person fundraiser at his Beverly Hills residence with Obama as the main attraction.

In 2018, following the Stoneman Douglas High School shooting, Katzenberg pledged $500,000 to the March for Our Lives gun-control demonstration.

Katzenberg donated approximately $1.8 million to a PAC supporting Karen Bass's Los Angeles mayoral bid in 2022.

In 2023, Katzenberg was named as one of the national co-chairs of Joe Biden's 2024 campaign for reelection as president. Katzenberg noted he would provide significant financial support for Biden's re-election. In December 2023, Katzenberg hosted a fundraiser and, at the time, dismissed concerns about Biden's age, instead referring to it as "his superpower".

In 2024, Katzenberg was an advisor to and co-chair of the Biden reelection campaign. After Biden dropped out of the race, Katzenberg became co-chair of Kamala Harris's 2024 presidential campaign.

=== SOPA/PIPA ===
When the White House announced its opposition to the Stop Online Piracy Act (SOPA) in January 2012, Chris Dodd, the former Senator and head of the Motion Picture Association of America, the film industry's lobbying organization, contacted Katzenberg to obtain more information about the president's plans. When Dodd reportedly asked him to intervene, Katzenberg declined, but "sought to soothe hurt feelings and lay the groundwork for a deal more friendly to Hollywood". Katzenberg's office contacted Obama and urged him to contact other studio chiefs in order to reaffirm their support. Obama would take the advice, making Katzenberg one of the few Hollywood executives working on brokering a compromise with Silicon Valley.

== Personal life ==
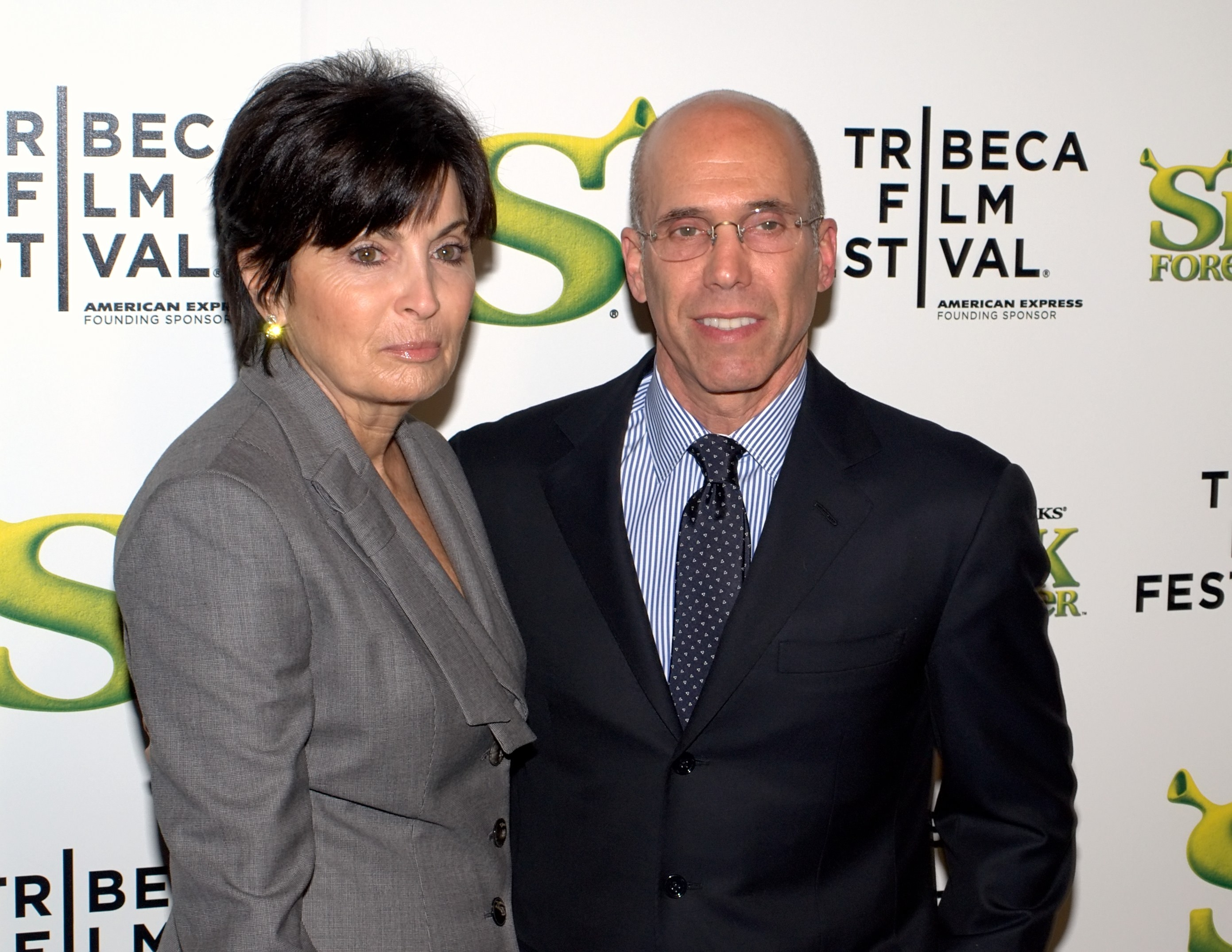
Marilyn and Jeffrey Katzenberg in 2010

Katzenberg married Marilyn Siegel, a kindergarten teacher, in 1975. They have twin children, born in 1983.

Katzenberg and his wife have been highly active in charitable causes. They donated the multimillion-dollar Katzenberg Center to Boston University's College of General Studies, citing that the school gave their two children the "love of education". They also donated the Marilyn and Jeffrey Katzenberg Center for Animation at the University of Southern California.

Katzenberg sits on the board of directors of multiple organizations, including the Motion Picture & Television Fund, Geffen Playhouse, Cedars-Sinai Medical Center, AIDS Project Los Angeles, The Michael J. Fox Foundation, California Institute of the Arts, Simon Wiesenthal Center, and the USC School of Cinematic Arts. In 2008, Katzenberg founded the DreamWorks Animation Academy in partnership with Inner-City Arts, a Los Angeles-based art education nonprofit organization, to provide inner-city students with instruction in digital media production.

In January 2025, Katzenberg and his wife donated $5 million to the Motion Picture & Television Fund for relief efforts regarding the Southern California wildfires.

Katzenberg had an estimated worth of $900 million in 2016.

== Filmography ==
=== Films ===
Year	Title	Credits	Production company	Notes
1979	Star Trek: The Motion Picture	Executive in charge of production	Paramount Pictures	
1985	The Black Cauldron	Executive in charge of production/Editor	Walt Disney Animation Studios	The latter uncredited
1986	The Great Mouse Detective	Executive in charge of production	Walt Disney Animation Studios	
1987	Down and Out in Beverly Hills	Executive in charge of production	Touchstone Pictures (Walt Disney Studios)	
1987	Three Men and a Baby	Executive in charge of production	Touchstone Pictures (Walt Disney Studios)	
1988	Who Framed Roger Rabbit	Executive in charge of production	Touchstone Pictures (Walt Disney Studios)	
1988	Oliver & Company	Executive in charge of production	Walt Disney Animation Studios	
1989	The Little Mermaid	Executive in charge of production	Walt Disney Animation Studios	
1990	The Rescuers Down Under	Executive in charge of production	Walt Disney Animation Studios	
1991	Beauty and the Beast	Executive in charge of production	Walt Disney Animation Studios	
1992	Aladdin	Executive in charge of production	Walt Disney Animation Studios	
1993	The Nightmare Before Christmas	Executive in charge of production	Touchstone Pictures (Walt Disney Studios)	
1994	The Lion King	Executive in charge of production	Walt Disney Animation Studios	
1995	Your Studio and You	Executive in charge of production	Universal Pictures	Short
1995	Pocahontas	Executive in charge of production	Walt Disney Animation Studios	Partially
1998	Antz	Executive in charge of production	DreamWorks Animation	
1998	The Prince of Egypt	Executive producer	DreamWorks Animation	
1999	American Beauty	Producer	DreamWorks Pictures	uncredited
2000	The Road to El Dorado	Executive producer/Director	DreamWorks Animation	The latter uncredited
2000	Chicken Run	Executive producer	DreamWorks Animation	
2000	Joseph: King of Dreams	Executive producer	DreamWorks Animation	Video
2001	Shrek	Producer/Director	DreamWorks Animation	The latter uncredited
2002	Spirit: Stallion of the Cimarron	Producer/Director	DreamWorks Animation	The latter uncredited
2003	Sinbad: Legend of the Seven Seas	Producer/Director	DreamWorks Animation	The latter uncredited
2004	Shrek 2	Executive producer	DreamWorks Animation	
2004	Shark Tale	Executive producer	DreamWorks Animation	
2005	Madagascar	Executive in charge of production/voice actor (as Rico and Abner)	DreamWorks Animation	
2005	Wallace & Gromit: The Curse of the Were-Rabbit	Executive in charge of production	DreamWorks Animation	
2006	Over the Hedge	Executive in charge of production	DreamWorks Animation	
2006	Flushed Away	Executive in charge of production	DreamWorks Animation	
2007	Shrek the Third	Executive in charge of production	DreamWorks Animation	
2007	Bee Movie	Executive in charge of production/Special thanks	DreamWorks Animation	
2008	Kung Fu Panda	Executive in charge of production	DreamWorks Animation	
2008	Madagascar: Escape 2 Africa	Executive in charge of production	DreamWorks Animation	
2009	Monsters vs. Aliens	Executive in charge of production	DreamWorks Animation	
2010	Arthur 3: The War of the Two Worlds	Animation director	EuropaCorp	
2010	How to Train Your Dragon	Executive in charge of production	DreamWorks Animation	
2010	Shrek Forever After	Executive in charge of production	DreamWorks Animation	
2010	Megamind	Executive in charge of production	DreamWorks Animation	
2011	Kung Fu Panda 2	Executive in charge of production	DreamWorks Animation	
2011	Puss in Boots	Executive in charge of production	DreamWorks Animation	
2012	Madagascar 3: Europe's Most Wanted	Executive in charge of production	DreamWorks Animation	
2012	Rise of the Guardians	Executive in charge of production	DreamWorks Animation	
2013	The Croods	Executive in charge of production	DreamWorks Animation	
2013	Turbo	Executive in charge of production	DreamWorks Animation	
2014	Mr. Peabody & Sherman	Executive in charge of production	DreamWorks Animation	
2014	How to Train Your Dragon 2	Executive in charge of production	DreamWorks Animation	
2014	Penguins of Madagascar	Executive in charge of production	DreamWorks Animation	
2015	Home	Executive in charge of production	DreamWorks Animation	
2016	Kung Fu Panda 3	Executive in charge of production	DreamWorks Animation	
2016	Trolls	Executive in charge of production	DreamWorks Animation	Partially
2017	The Boss Baby	Executive in charge of production	DreamWorks Animation	Partially
2017	Captain Underpants: The First Epic Movie	Executive in charge of production	DreamWorks Animation	Partially

=== Television ===
Year	Title	Occupation	Notes
2004	Father of the Pride	Creator/Executive producer	2 episodes
2005–2009	The Contender	Executive producer	26 episodes
2005	The Contender Rematch: Mora vs. Manfredo	Executive producer	TV special
2008	The Contender Asia	Executive producer	12 episodes
2010	Neighbors from Hell	Executive producer	5 episodes
2020	Dummy	Producer	wiip, Heller Highwater Pictures, Let's Go Again
2020	Thanks a Million	Producer	Short TV series
2020	Elba vs. Block	Producer	
2020	Beauty	Producer	Short series
2020	Benedict Men	Producer	TV series
2021	The Now	Executive producer	
2022	Natural Born Narco	Executive producer	

== Honors and recognition ==
Katzenberg was awarded an honorary Doctor of Arts degree by Ringling College of Art and Design in 2008, the first in the school's history.

The Academy of Motion Picture Arts and Sciences awarded Katzenberg with the Jean Hersholt Humanitarian Award in 2012, in acknowledgment of his role in "raising money for education, art and health-related causes, particularly those benefiting the motion picture industry". The following year, Katzenberg was awarded the National Medal of Arts by President Obama.

At the 2017 Cannes Film Festival, Katzenberg was awarded an honorary Palme d'Or, the festival's highest prize. Cannes director Thierry Frémaux credited Katzenberg and Shrek with expanding the range of films considered at the competition. Katzenberg compared the distinction to the earlier Academy recognition.

Organizations	Year	Category	Work	Result	Ref.
Academy Awards	2002	Best Animated Feature	Spirit: Stallion of the Cimarron	Nominated	
Academy Awards	2011	Jean Hersholt Humanitarian Award	Himself	Honored	
BAFTA Awards	2001	Best Film	Shrek	Nominated	
BAFTA Children's Award	2001	Best Feautre Film	Shrek	Won	
Cannes Film Festival	2017	Honorary Palme d'Or	Himself	Honored	
National Endowment for the Arts	2014	National Medal of Arts	Himself	Honored	
Producers Guild of America Award	2001	Best Theatrical Motion Picture	Shrek	Nominated	
Producers Guild of America Award	2004	Milestone Award	Himself	Honored	
