= Margery Tabankin =

American political activist

- Born: December 10, 1947 (age 78); Newark, New Jersey
- Education: University of Wisconsin–Madison
- Occupation: Political activist

Margery Tabankin (born 1948) is an American progressive political activist. She is known for serving as a conduit between Hollywood donors and liberal political causes in Washington D.C.

== Biography ==
Tabankin became a nationally known campus radical during the 1960s. She was inspired to become a part of the New Left political movement after hearing activist Tom Hayden give a speech in her hometown of Newark, New Jersey. She graduated from Weequahic High School in 1965. Tabankin became an anti-war activist while attending the University of Wisconsin–Madison.

At age 23, Tabankin was elected the first woman president of the National Student Association. In late 1969, she was picked to become one of the first women student trainees at leftist activist Saul Alinsky's School of Community Organizing in Chicago.

She later worked for President Jimmy Carter's administration, heading up the VISTA program. After her time working at the White House, Tabankin moved to Los Angeles, where she became executive director of the Hollywood Women's Political Committee.

She has a consulting firm, Margery Tabankin and Associates. Tabankin works with Hollywood celebrities like Barbra Streisand, Steven Spielberg and Donna Karan to allocate funds to liberal political causes. She has led the Arca Foundation, which is funded with the R. J. Reynolds family fortune, and the Barbra Streisand Foundation.

Tabankin has met with Fidel Castro and Yasser Arafat.
