= Jane Fonda's Workout =

Exercise video by Jane Fonda

1982 VHS release in Australia

Jane Fonda's Workout, also known as Workout Starring Jane Fonda, is a 1982 exercise video by actress Jane Fonda, based on an exercise routine developed by Leni Cazden and refined by Cazden and Fonda at Workout, their exercise studio in Beverly Hills. The video release by Karl Home Video and RCA Video Productions was aimed primarily at women as a way to exercise at home. The video was part of a series of exercise products: Jane Fonda's Workout Book was released in November 1981, and both Jane Fonda's Workout video tape and Jane Fonda's Workout Record, published as a double-LP vinyl album, appeared in late April 1982. The VHS tape became a bestseller, and Fonda released further videos throughout the 1980s and into 1995. The video also increased the sales of VCRs.

The original 1982 Jane Fonda's Workout was the first non-theatrical home video release to top sales charts. In total, Fonda sold 17 million videos in the 1982–1995 series, considered an enormous success. Fonda's accomplishment spawned imitators and sparked a boom of women's exercise classes, opening the formerly male-dominated fitness industry to women and establishing the celebrity-as-fitness-instructor model. The ballet-style leg warmers she wore increased the popularity of an ongoing fashion trend, and her encouraging shout, "Feel the burn!", became a common saying, along with the proverb "no pain, no gain."

The success of Fonda's workout series funded her political activism, which was her original goal. Profits from the Workout franchise supplied money for the political action committee (PAC) she had been running with her husband, the activist and politician Tom Hayden. Their PAC, named Campaign for Economic Democracy, promoted left-wing political issues such as women's rights and the anti-war movement. In 1984, Fonda used her Workout money to help pay for a new PAC with Barbra Streisand and ten others forming the Hollywood Women's Political Committee.

== Exercise studio, book, and LP ==
In 1978, Fonda broke an ankle bone while filming The China Syndrome, forcing a stop to her ballet exercises. She sought a new exercise regimen that would help her lose weight and stay trim without stressing her foot. She was referred to Leni Cazden, an exercise instructor in Century City who formulated a lengthy exercise sequence to burn calories. Fonda took classes from Cazden and adopted her style of exercise. Fonda later recalled that women in 1978 had few choices for exercise classes and that most gyms were designed for men. She said, "We weren't supposed to sweat or have muscles. Now, along with forty other women, I found myself moving nonstop for an hour and a half in entirely new ways." On location in Utah shooting The Electric Horseman in late 1978 and early 1979, Fonda taught her actor colleagues the exercises she had learned from Cazden, and was encouraged by the warm reception. In May 1979, she partnered with Cazden to open an exercise studio called Workout on Robertson Boulevard in Beverly Hills. The sign above the studio's door read "Jane Fonda's Workout". One week of instruction (five one-hour sessions) cost $32.50. Two to three thousand customers attended per week, likely because Fonda taught some of the early morning classes. Merv Griffin and Barbara Walters shot segments at the studio to air on their television shows. Famous customers included actresses Ali MacGraw, Tina Louise and Peggy Lipton. The new business was profitable. With the concept proved, Fonda added a second studio in Encino and a third in San Francisco. She wrote Jane Fonda's Workout Book to bring the technique to a wider audience. The book was published in November 1981 through Paramount-owned Simon & Schuster and sold 2 million copies.

In parallel with the exercise book, Fonda released the vinyl LP Jane Fonda's Workout Record through Columbia Records in April 1982, which sold steadily at $12.98. It was certified double Platinum by the Recording Industry Association of America in December 1984. On the album, Fonda speaks as exercise instructor, backed by music. The double album contained songs by the Jacksons, the Brothers Johnson, Boz Scaggs, REO Speedwagon, Sylvester, Quincy Jones and others. A cassette tape version was also sold. While preparing the book and audio recording, Fonda was already considering a video.

== Video ==
=== Exercise industry ===
Exercise products had already been selling briskly before Fonda entered the field. Carol Hensel released an aerobic Dancercize album in 1980, selling 500,000 LPs and starting the 1980s craze for exercise. Hensel's later Dance & Exercise videos went Platinum. Richard Simmons was already producing exercise records; his 1982 Reach LP was certified Platinum before it shipped, based on advance orders.

Video Aerobics, featuring Leslie Lilien and Julie Lavin and available on videotape in 1979, was the first in the home video category of exercise tapes. The same title appeared in 1982–83 in an updated new shoot. Erotic photographer Ron Harris produced the Aerobicise program which aired on paid cable TV, and in early 1982 he sold a novelty aerobics video tape, Aerobicise: The Beautiful Workout, featuring close-up shots of the exercising women. Harris's abstract camera work was seen as an application of "art instead of instruction", appealing to men and useless for exercise.

There are two conflicting stories about how Fonda's exercise video project was started. Stuart Karl's version is that he brought the idea to Fonda in late 1981 after the book came out in November, while Richard D. Klinger says he and Karl called Fonda in early 1981 before the book. According to Karl, he was a young entrepreneur in Southern California starting a home video publishing company called Karl Home Video. His wife, Deborah, saw Fonda's Workout book promoted in a store window, and remarked that she would rather watch Fonda teach the workout on home video. Seeing an opportunity to bring exercise tapes to the home video market, Karl contacted Fonda's husband, the activist and politician Tom Hayden, to propose the idea as a source of campaign funding. Hayden put Karl in touch with Fonda, but she initially declined; the home video market was new and unfamiliar to her – she did not know a single person who owned a videocassette recorder (VCR). Karl persisted, and Fonda was persuaded by the possibility of extra money for her Campaign for Economic Democracy (CED), a political action committee founded by Hayden and Fonda in 1976 to promote liberal and progressive issues. Karl teamed with RCA Video Productions on the project. Fonda signed with Karl and RCA in early 1982.

According to Richard D. Klinger, an executive in RCA Records' SelectaVision video group, Karl and Klinger contacted Fonda about shooting a video of her Beverly Hills exercise routine in early 1981. At the time, she was still creating Jane Fonda's Workout Book, and she said she should first present the video idea to her book publisher, Simon & Schuster. David Obst at Simon & Schuster was keen on the proposal, but it was rejected by their affiliate Paramount Home Video. Fonda returned to Klinger and Karl who then entered into a joint production deal in which RCA would make the video discs while Karl would make the video tapes. Klinger was named West Coast director of RCA Video in January 1982. Karl Home Video and RCA Video Productions began shooting Fonda's video in early 1982. Simon & Schuster later regretted their decision, and by 1985 they were shopping for video projects. Paramount head Barry Diller said in August 1983 that Paramount ignored obtaining publishing rights to business opportunities such as the Fonda workout video because Paramount executives were not familiar with the process. After this prominent failure, Diller said Paramount vigorously pursued the rights to related business ideas.

=== Fonda's Workout ===
With a budget of $50,000, $75,000, or $100,000, Fonda started shooting the video with her friend, director Sid Galanty, a fellow Democrat known for making political advertisements for television. Fonda suggested that she act out a scripted role but Galanty convinced her to ad-lib and be herself. Galanty proposed shooting outdoors but Fonda insisted on a sprung floor suitable for dancers. Fonda's Beverly Hills studio proved to be incompatible because the mirrored walls reflected lights and cameras. Instead, Galanty built a theatrical set for the video, and the production crew worked out the many technical problems. Filming with music was impractical because the recording of Fonda's voice needed to be as pure as possible, so only the beats, the lowest frequencies of the music were amplified, to be filtered out in the editing. Fonda was unable to simultaneously talk to the viewer and count through her movements, so she took timing cues from hand gestures given by assistants stationed at the camera. Behind Fonda and also barefoot, a group of seven instructors and students from her exercise studios took part in the routine; they, too, watched the timing cues. Every exercise sequence was filmed in one long take, and if Fonda or Galanty saw a problem in playback, they filmed the whole sequence over again, which was physically demanding. Principal photography was done in three days, and editing was finished by mid-March.

1982 RCA SelectaVision Capacitance Electronic Disc label

The Workout video was released on April 24, 1982, at the price of $59.95 for the video tape, equivalent to $200 in 2025. Karl Home Video released the video tape, and three months later RCA Video Productions issued the workout on Capacitance Electronic Disc (CED), a vinyl video format, selling for $24.98; less than half the cost of the tape. Galanty was listed as producer. Joe Chemay and John Hobbs composed Fonda's original theme music for the video; the two had worked together on Chemay's 1981 R&B-pop album The Riper the Finer. The RCA SelectaVision version of the video offered two audio channels, one with Fonda's verbal instruction, and the other with monaural music. The consumer would normally listen to both at once, but after they had memorized the routine, they could listen to the music by itself. Fonda's Workout appeared on the video sales chart of Billboard magazine on May 22, 1982, entering at number 23. The video rose up the chart to the number 4 position on June 19, and from that point, stayed at number 4 and above for three years. During 1982–1985, the video topped the chart for a total of forty-one weeks, dipping to number 2 for seventy-five weeks. At that time, no other video came close to this level of sales performance. Workout was the first non-theatrical home video release to top sales charts.

Fonda herself prevented the Workout video from racking up better chart statistics, as she was competing against it through the home video release of her film On Golden Pond (1981) which was number 1 for fifteen weeks in 1982. Three years later, Fonda charted with the home video release of We Are the World: The Video Event which she narrated. We Are the World hit number 1 in August 1985, edging the Workout video down to number 2. Many of Fonda's later videos in the workout series also charted: in February 1985, three at once were in the Top Ten of Billboard's chart. Billboard magazine featured Fonda on the cover at the end of August 1985, describing her "video victory" and carrying articles about the actress, the exercise series, and the surprising sales juggernaut. Many buyers of the exercise video also required a playback device, boosting sales of VCRs. These new VCRs contributed to a general surge in home video popularity during the 1980s, extending far beyond Fonda's Workout. By 1985, about one-third of American households owned a VCR, up from 2.5 percent in 1980.

Lorimar Productions was a television production company known for many hit television shows, such as Dallas. Lorimar wanted a share of the profits from Fonda's Workout series, and so bought out Karl in October 1984 for a reported $3 million, rebranding the company as Karl-Lorimar. Karl stayed in command of the workout video department, adding more Fonda titles as well as some by Richard Simmons.

Fonda told her viewers to "feel the burn", which became a popular catchphrase. She was criticized for this because ignoring a burning sensation in one's body might lead to injury. Other criticism came from her saying to the viewer, "if I can do it, you can do it"; a seemingly impossible task for those who were not as muscular as Fonda. Medical professionals warned that Fonda teaching people jerky movements might lead to muscle injury, and that the proverb she repeated, "no pain, no gain", should not be taken literally, especially with regard to sharp pain which may indicate tissue damage. Instead, people who participate in aerobic exercise were advised to pay attention to the general feeling of discomfort brought on by the formation of lactic acid in the body during extended exertion, showing the limits of one's cardiorespiratory fitness. Fonda grew concerned about reports of some of her customers getting stress fractures or experiencing back pain, so for her next releases, she tempered her style, emphasizing gentle stretching and low-impact movements, and her spoken encouragements became more inclusive, such as "Hang in there, we're almost done!" Leg warmers had already been popular with ballet dancers to wear during instruction and stretching, but with Fonda seen sporting them in her exercise books and videos, they were adopted by many more women across the US in the 1980s. For years previously, Fonda had worn leg warmers for ballet classes, and was surprised to find that her name was associated with the trend.

As the videos gained popularity, Julie LaFond was hired as the manager of Fonda's Workout franchise. Fonda and LaFond closed the San Francisco Workout studio in 1983 after two years of operation. The building's other tenants had complained about the noise of the exercises. In 1986, the Encino location was shuttered after posting losses. In April 1991, Fonda's original Beverly Hills location closed, even though it was still profitable. Fonda said she was concentrating on her core business, which by this time was the video tape series, run by LaFond.

Fonda signed with Capri Beachwear in June 1983 to produce a line of Workout-branded exercise clothing, designed by Broadway costumer Theoni V. Aldredge and made in the U.S. by union shops. Fonda expected to see gross sales of $30 million with this line. The clothing was to be sold at Macy's and Saks Fifth Avenue, but after the line appeared piecemeal and incomplete for a few months, the enterprise folded in 1984. Thoroughgoing supply problems, high retail price tags and market inexperience all contributed to the failure. Capri Beachwear absorbed the losses and shut down, bankrupting owner Ron Mester.

== Activism ==
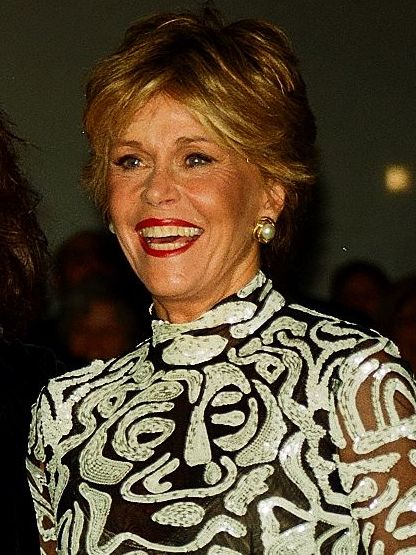
Jane Fonda in 2000

Fonda used her Workout profits, including the studios, the book, the audio recording and the videos, to fund her political activism. The Campaign for Economic Democracy PAC which she founded in 1976 with her husband Tom Hayden owned all of her Workout assets, such that the video profits went directly to the PAC treasury. Buoyed by Workout money, the CED PAC successfully supported Hayden's campaign in 1982 running for the California State Assembly, and it pursued various liberal and New Left issues such as advocating for rent control, the reduction of water pollution, investing in solar power and protesting against nuclear power, championing labor rights, women's rights, and various anti-war initiatives. In early 1984, Fonda pulled some of the Workout assets away from the CED PAC so she could follow her own interests separate from Hayden's. In this manner she promoted abortion rights and worked against apartheid in South Africa. In August 1984, Barbra Streisand, Fonda, and ten other women formed the Hollywood Women's Political Committee (HWPC). Though she was not directly active in the day-to-day decisions of the HWPC, its political goals were many of the same ones Fonda had promoted with Hayden through the CED PAC. In 1987, Fonda bought her Workout franchise from CED to control it herself. By 1988, Fonda had donated about $10 million to political causes; mainly drawn from her workout video series.

Similarly to Fonda, Karl funneled some of his Workout video distribution profits into political donations, especially to the 1988 campaign of Democratic presidential primary candidate Gary Hart. Hart had been the frontrunner in polls in April 1987, and the favored candidate of Fonda and Hayden, but he resigned from the race in May after news reports showed him to be unfaithful to his wife. In December 1987 he declared a second run, and Karl broke federal campaign guidelines to fund Hart's new effort. These irregularities were revealed by the Miami Herald at the beginning of 1988. Hart resigned a second and final time in March. In federal court, Karl pleaded guilty to hiding $185,000 in political donations through reimbursed third parties, and was hit with a fine of $60,000 and a sentence of probation for three years. Faced with business losses and conflict-of-interest lawsuits, in July 1989 he declared bankruptcy; he died of skin cancer in 1991 at the age of 38.

== Legacy ==
Fonda reshaped the home video industry by selling 17 million videos from 1982 to 1995; far more than any other non-theatrical title in that period. The fitness industry traces a large measure of its success to Fonda's Workout series. Equinox Group's National Director Carol Espel said about Fonda, "She opened the door for us who were either dancers or interested in fitness to become professionals and create an industry... She helped legitimize fitness as a viable business." Many dance and fitness instructors of the late 1970s and early 1980s rode the wave created by Workout, expanding their businesses dramatically. Richard Simmons embraced the new video format with 1985's Get Started. Jazzercise was already an established exercise studio in the North County San Diego area, releasing a popular LP, but after Fonda the company grew very quickly, releasing aerobics videos and opening many franchise studios. In 1985, fitness teacher Joanie Greggains shifted from LPs to video with Total Shape Up, and in 1987, personal trainer Kathy Smith followed suit by releasing Starting Out for beginners. Jake Steinfeld of Body by Jake fame delivered the Energize Yourself video in 1986. On the other hand, aerobics dance pioneer Jacki Sorensen watched her large organization reduce in size through the 1980s, partly because of competition.

A handful of celebrities capitalized on the exercise video concept, including Cher, Arnold Schwarzenegger, Caitlyn Jenner, Pat Boone, Debbie Reynolds and Raquel Welch. While Fonda encouraged her viewers to get in shape so that they could go out and change the world, the message in Welch's yoga-oriented video was to get in shape to change the inner self. These stars enjoyed limited sales, never matching Fonda's reach.

In 2010, Fonda released the first of three videos in her new series titled Prime Time, aimed at users 50 years and older. In 2014 after many requests, she re-released five of her original 1980s videos on DVD and digital download, followed in 2018 by the re-release of another two of her videos from the early 1990s. In 2020 during the COVID-19 pandemic, Fonda recorded a brief exercise sequence at age 82, sympathizing with people who exercise at home while quarantined. Combining her political activism with 1980s-era video scenes and recently shot footage, Fonda gained views on Instagram and TikTok.

== See also ==
- 20th century women's fitness culture
