= No pain, no gain =

Proverb and exercise motto

No pain, no gain (or "No gain without pain") is a proverb, used since the 1980s as an exercise motto that promises greater value rewards for the price of hard and even painful work. Under this conception, competitive professionals, such as athletes and artists, are required to endure pain (physical suffering) and stress (mental/emotional suffering) to achieve professional excellence. Medical experts agree that the proverb is mostly ineffective for exercise.

== Exercise motto ==
It came into prominence after 1982 when actress Jane Fonda began to produce a series of aerobics workout videos. In these videos, Fonda would use "No pain, no gain" and "Feel the burn" as catchphrases for the concept of working out past the point of experiencing muscle aches.

It expresses the belief that solid large muscle is the result of training hard. Delayed onset muscle soreness is often used as a measure of the effectiveness of a workout.

In terms of the expression used for development, the discomfort caused may be beneficial in some instances while detrimental in others. Detrimental pain can include joint pain. Beneficial pain usually refers to that resulting from tearing microscopic muscle fibers, which will be rebuilt more densely, making bigger muscles.

The expression has been adopted in a variety of sports and fitness activities, beginning in 1982 to present day.

David B. Morris wrote in The Scientist in 2005, "'No pain, no gain' is an American modern mini-narrative: it compresses the story of a protagonist who understands that the road to achievement runs only through hardship." The concept has been described as being a modern form of Puritanism.

== Origin ==
The ancient Greek poet Hesiod (c. 750-650 BC) expresses this idea in Works and Days where he wrote:

...But before the road of Excellence the immortal gods have placed sweat. And the way to it is long and steep and rough at first. But when one arrives at the summit, then it is easy, even though remaining difficult.

The ancient Greek playwright Sophocles (5th Century BC) expresses this idea in the play Electra (line 945). This line is translated as: "nothing truly succeeds without pain", "nothing succeeds without toil", "there is no success without hard work", and "Without labour nothing prospers (well)."

A form of this expression is found in the beginning of the second century, written in The Ethics of the Fathers 5:23 (known in Hebrew as Pirkei Avot), which quotes Ben Hei Hei as saying, "According to the pain is the reward." This is interpreted to be a spiritual lesson; without the pain in doing what God commands, there is no spiritual gain.

In 1577 British poet Nicholas Breton wrote: "They must take pain that look for any gain."

One of the earliest attestations of the phrase comes from the poet Robert Herrick in his "Hesperides". In the 1650 edition, a two-line poem was added:

NO PAINS, NO GAINS.

If little labour, little are our gains:

Man's fate is according to his pains.

— Hesperides 752.

A version of the phrase was crafted by Benjamin Franklin, in his persona of Poor Richard (1734), to illustrate the axiom "God helps those who help themselves":

Industry need not wish, as Poor Richard says, and he that lives upon hope will die fasting. There are no gains, without pains...

— as reprinted in his The Way to Wealth (1758)

In the phrase, Franklin's central thesis was that everyone should exercise 45 minutes each day.

In 1853 R. C. Trench wrote in On Lessons in Proverbs iv: "For the most part they courageously accept the law of labour, No pains, no gains,—No sweat, no sweet, as the appointed law and condition of man's life."

In 1859 Samuel Smiles included “No pains no gains” in a list of proverbs about the secret to making money in his book Self-Help.

== See also ==
- Pain & Gain
- Sports injury
- What does not kill me, makes me stronger (quote by Nietzsche)
