= Campaign for Economic Democracy =

California-based progressive political advocacy organization

- Abbreviation: CED
- Formation: 1976
- Dissolved: July 1986
- Type: Political advocacy organization
- Legal status: defunct
- Headquarters: Santa Monica, California
- Members: 12,000
- Leader: Tom Hayden

Campaign for Economic Democracy (CED) was a California-based progressive political advocacy organization founded in 1976 by activist and politician Tom Hayden and his wife, actress and activist Jane Fonda. The CED promoted economic democracy, focusing its efforts on a broad range of issues, including rent control, reduction of water pollution, investing in solar power and fighting against nuclear power, advocating labor rights, women's rights and various anti-war initiatives. The CED helped Hayden shift his radical left image more to the center, to reduce opposition and allow him to win his political campaigns. At the same time, pressure from the CED was intended to move the Democratic Party to the left. The CED successfully passed rent control laws in 1979 in Santa Monica, and they backed the 1986 California Proposition 65 to reduce toxins discharged into public water sources.

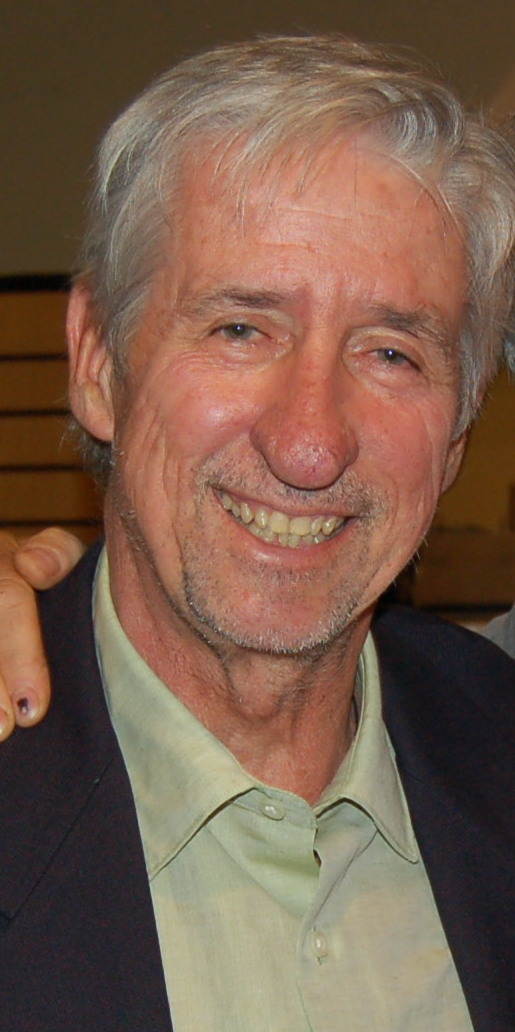
Tom Hayden in 2007

Another goal of the CED was to support Hayden's hard-fought 1982 bid for a seat on the California State Assembly, in which he was victorious. That same year, the CED helped to elect 60 California state politicians.

The CED was funded at first by money from Fonda's film career, then increasingly by the growing Jane Fonda's Workout media franchise, including three exercise studios in 1979–80, the best-selling Jane Fonda's Workout Book in 1981, and in 1982 a Platinum-certified exercise record and the hugely popular home video, which developed into a series. In early 1982 before the LP and video were released, Hayden said the PAC was receiving $30,000 each month from Fonda's workout studios and book. In 1984, Fonda reduced her contributions to the CED in order to fund her own political interests, such as abortion rights and ending apartheid in South Africa. Even so, the CED reported that Fonda's Workout franchise had donated about $800,000 in 1986 – half of their annual budget.

Fonda gradually pulled back from the CED, reducing her visibility due to the persistent political backlash against her 1972 visit to Hanoi, Vietnam, when she rashly posed for photos on an enemy anti-aircraft artillery unit. Hayden saw poll results showing that negative feelings for Fonda among voters were probably holding back his political rise. The CED disbanded in July 1986 to be replaced by Hayden's Campaign California using the same headquarters and staff, but widening to state and national aspirations.
