= Circuit training =

Conditioning training method with consecutive exercises

Circuit training is a form of body conditioning that involves endurance training, resistance training, high-intensity aerobics, and exercises performed in a circuit, similar to high-intensity interval training. It targets strength building and muscular endurance. An exercise "circuit" is one completion of all set exercises in the program. When one circuit is completed, one begins the first exercise again for the next circuit. Traditionally, the time between exercises in circuit training is short and often with rapid movement to the next exercise.

The program was developed by R.E. Morgan and G.T. Anderson in 1953 at the University of Leeds in England.

== Typical activities in a circuit training ==
A circuit should work each section of the body individually. Typical activities include:

Upper-body

- Push ups
- Bench dips
- Back extensions
- Medicine ball chest pass
- Bench press
- Inclined press up

Core & trunk

- Sit ups (lower abdominal)
- Stomach crunch (upper abdominal)
- Back extension chest raise

Lower-body

- Squat jumps
- Compass jumps
- Astride jumps
- Step ups
- Shuttle runs
- Hopping shuttles
- Bench squats

Total-body

- Burpees
- Treadmills
- Squat thrusts
- Skipping
- Jogging

== Effects of circuit training ==
Studies at Baylor University and The Cooper Institute show that circuit training is the most time-efficient way to enhance cardiovascular fitness and muscle endurance. Studies show that circuit training helps women to achieve their goals and maintain them longer than other forms of exercise or diet.

A summary of one study noted the following:

Perhaps a most profound finding of this study, from a health perspective, is that this investigation clearly shows that performance of this circuit of exercises, this level of intensity elicited oxygen consumption values (39% to 51.5% of VO2max) that meet established guidelines of the American College of Sports Medicine (ACSM) for the recommended intensity (40% to 85% of VO2maxR) of exercise for developing and maintaining cardio-respiratory fitness. Thus, this circuit not only provides a suitable muscular fitness stimulus but also helps to meet ACSM cardiovascular guidelines and the newly published Dietary Guidelines for Americans 2005 for physical activity.

One advantage is that reduced station times will encourage participants to lift heavier weights, allowing them to achieve overload with a smaller number of repetitions, typically in the range of 25 to 50 depending on their training goals. This approach not only promotes muscle strength and endurance but also ensures efficient use of workout time. By focusing on heavier lifts, participants can target specific muscle groups more effectively, optimizing overall performance and progress.

== See also ==
- Bodyweight exercise
- Threshold training
- Calisthenics
- General fitness training
- High-intensity interval training
- Interval training
- Isometric exercise
- Long slow distance
- Power training
- Plyometric
- Resistance training
- Stretching
- Supercompensation
- Weight training
- vVO_{2}max
