= Endurance training =

Exercising to increase endurance

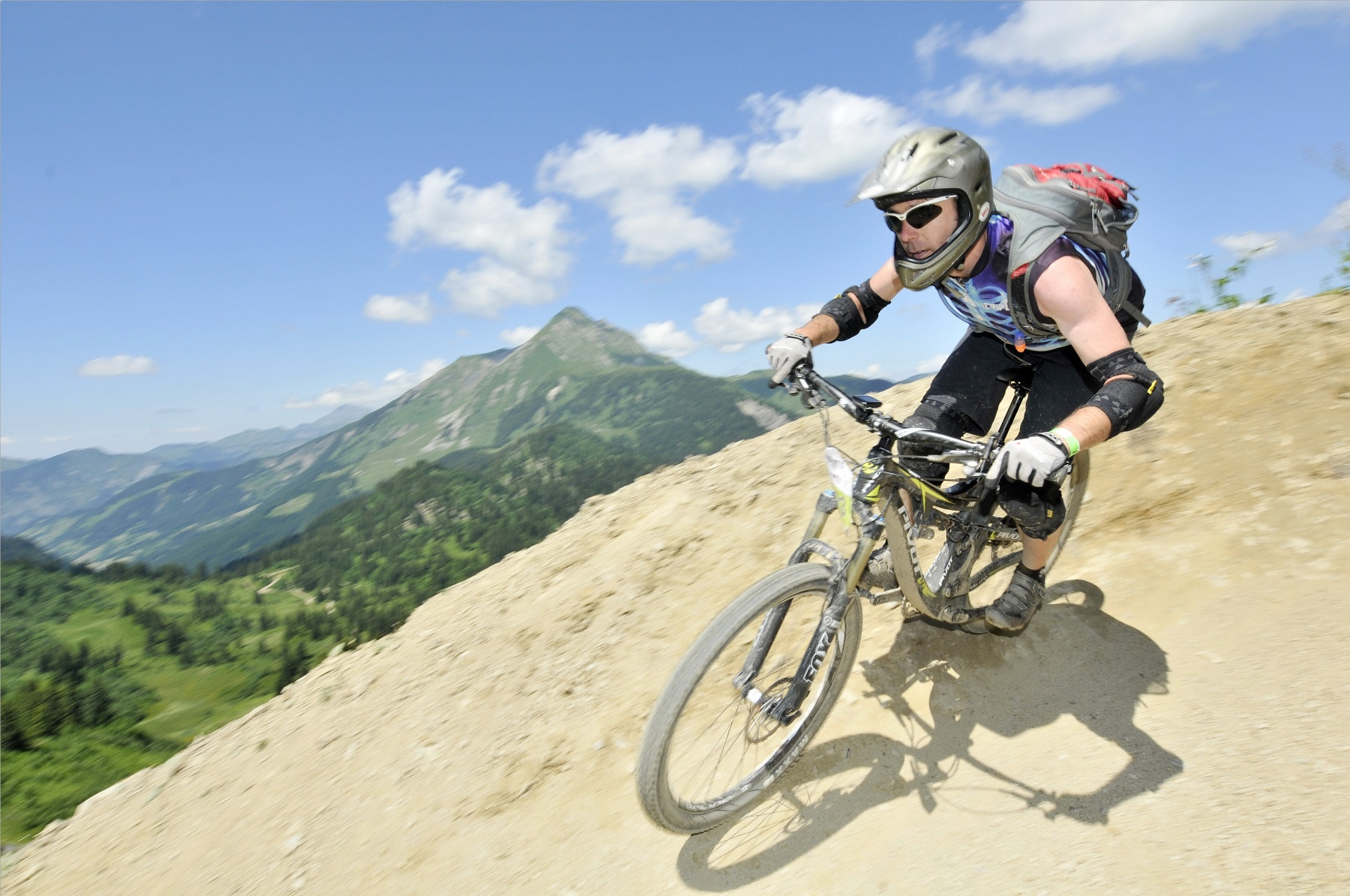
Man riding a mountain bike in a mountainous terrain in Alps.

Endurance training is the act of exercising to increase endurance. The term endurance training generally refers to training the aerobic system as opposed to the anaerobic system. The need for endurance in sports is often predicated as the need of cardiovascular and simple muscular endurance, but the issue of endurance is far more complex. Endurance can be divided into two categories including: general endurance and specific endurance. Endurance in sport is closely tied to the execution of skill and technique. A well conditioned athlete can be defined as, the athlete who executes their technique consistently and effectively with the least effort. Key for measuring endurance are heart rate, power in cycling and pace in running.

== Endurance in sports ==
Endurance training is essential for a variety of endurance sports. A notable example is distance running events (800 meters upwards to marathon and ultra-marathon) with the required degree of endurance training increasing with race distance. Two other popular examples are cycling (particularly road cycling) and competitive swimming. These three endurance sports are combined in the triathlon. Other sports for which extensive amounts of endurance training are required include rowing and cross country skiing. Athletes can also undergo endurance training when their sport may not necessarily be an endurance sport in the whole sense but may still demand some endurance. For instance aerobic endurance is necessary, in varying extents, in racket sports, football, rugby, martial arts, basketball and cricket. Endurance exercise tends to be popular with non-athletes for the purpose of increasing general fitness or burning more calories to increase weight loss potential.

== Physiological effects ==
Fundamental for endurance training is supercompensation. Supercompensation describes the adaptation of muscles on a previous stimulus over time.

Long-term endurance training induces many physiological adaptations both centrally and peripherally mediated. Central cardiovascular adaptations include decreased heart rate, increased stroke volume of the heart, increased cardiac output. Oxidative enzymes such as succinate dehydrogenase (SDH) that enable mitochondria to break down nutrients to form ATP increase by 2.5 times in well trained endurance athletes In addition to SDH, myoglobin increases by 75-80% in well trained endurance athletes.

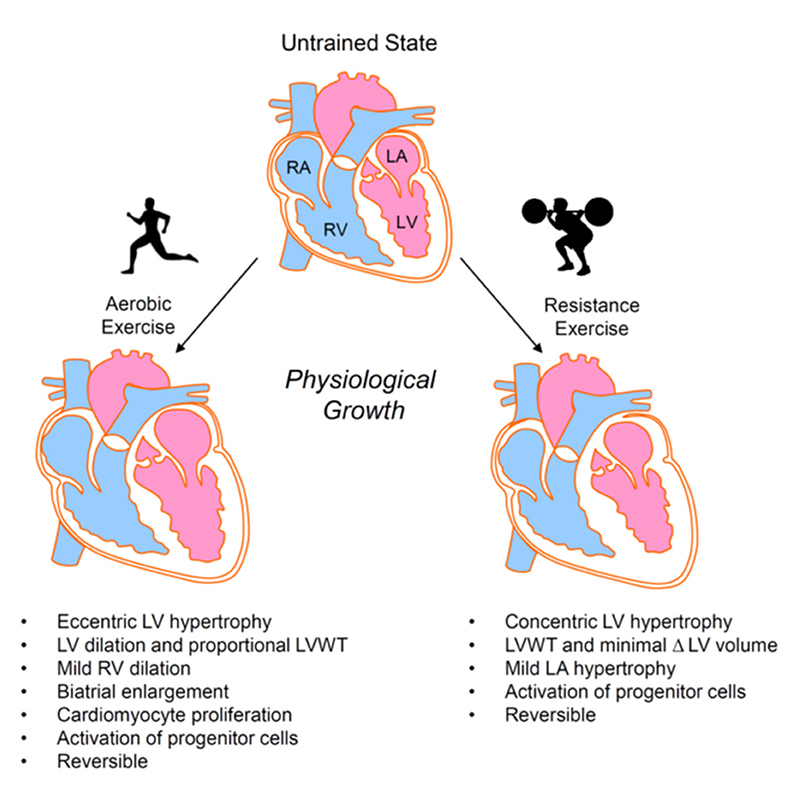
Aerobic/Endurance and Resistance/Strength exercise impact on cardiac remodeling and growth.

== Risks of excessive endurance training ==
The potential for negative health effects from long-term, high-volume endurance training have begun to emerge in the scientific literature in recent years. The known risks are primarily associated with training for and participation in extreme endurance events, and affect the cardiovascular system through adverse structural remodeling of the heart and the associated arteries, with heart-rhythm abnormalities perhaps being the most common resulting symptom. Endurance exercise can also reduce testosterone levels.

== Methods and training plans ==
Common methods for training include periodization, intervals, hard easy, long slow distance, and in recent years high-intensity interval training. The periodization method was accredited to Tudor Bompa and consists of blocks of time, generally 4–12 weeks each.

Traditionally, strength training (the performance of exercises with resistance or added weight) was not deemed appropriate for endurance athletes due to potential interference in the adaptive response to the endurance elements of an athlete's training plan. There were also misconceptions regarding the addition of excess body mass through muscle hypertrophy (growth) associated with strength training, which could negatively affect endurance performance by increasing the amount of work required to be completed by the athlete. However, more recent and comprehensive research has proved that short-term (8 weeks) strength training in addition to endurance training is beneficial for endurance performance, particularly long-distance running.

Literature describes various forms of endurance exercise

Form of exercise	Method	Goal	Intensity	Scope
Recovery and compensation exercise	Extensive-duration method	supporting recovery	lactate values below aerobic threshold	no long or too extensive sessions
Extensive basic endurance exercise	Extensive duration and interval technique, driving game	health aspects, fortification of endurance, fat metabolism exercise	lactate values clearly below aerobic threshold (50-77 %)	1–8 hours
Intensive basic endurance exercise within permanent load	Intensive duration technique	Improving cardio-vascular capabilities and use of glycogen	load up to anaerobic threshold 77–85 %	30–120 minutes
Intensive basic endurance exercise within interval load	Extensive Interval technique	Improving cardio-vascular capabilities and use of glycogen	Within anaerobic threshold (not further)	20–80 minutes
Competition specific intensity exercise	duration technique, intensive interval technique, repetition technique, competition technique	practicing specific speed within competition	equal intensity within competition, within high scopes below competition intensity	50–120 % of competition scope

== Devices to assess endurance fitness ==
The heart rate monitor is one of the relatively easy methods to assess fitness in endurance athletes. By comparing heart rate over time fitness gains can be observed when the heart rate decreases for running or cycling at a given speed. In cycling the effect of wind on the cyclists speed is difficult to subtract out and so many cyclists now use power meters built into their bicycles. The power meter allows the athlete to actually measure power output over a set duration or course and allows direct comparison of fitness progression. In the 2008 Olympics Michael Phelps was aided by repeated lactate threshold measurement. This allowed his coaches to fine tune his training program so that he could recover between swim events that were sometimes several minutes apart. Much similar to blood glucose for diabetes, lower priced lactate measurement devices are now available but in general the lactate measurement approach is still the domain of the professional coach and elite athlete.

== See also ==
- Aerobic exercise
- Endurance game
- Exercise-induced cardiomegaly
- Category:Endurance sports
