= Fartlek =

Training method for runners

Fartlek is a middle and long-distance runner's training approach developed in the late 1930s by Swedish Olympian Gösta Holmér. It has been described as a relatively unscientific blending of continuous training (e.g., long slow distance training), with its steady pace of moderate-high intensity aerobic intensity, and interval training, with its “spacing of more intense exercise and rest intervals.” Simply stated, in its widely adapted contemporary forms, Fartlek training is alternating periods of faster and slower running, often over natural terrain, including both “level and hilly terrain.”

While Fartlek training is generally associated with running, it can be incorporated into almost any kind of exercise. The variable intensities and the continuous nature of the exercise stresses both the aerobic and anaerobic parts of the runner's physiology. It differs from traditional interval training by being less structured.

An example of its more modern manifestations in the training of serious runners is found in Mona Fartlek, named for Australian distance runner Steve Moneghetti, devised by Olympian Chris Wardlaw. This training style injects speed into a 20 minute session, pairing alternating periods of effort and recovery: 90 seconds on, 90 seconds off (performed twice), then 60 seconds on-then-off, and 30 seconds on-then-off, and 15 seconds on-then-off (each of these performed four times), generally, with intensity (pace) increasing as the effort period shortens, with the specifics determined by coach and athlete.

== Etymology ==
The term Fartlek comes from Swedish, Fart the word for speed, and Lek means play, and so “speed-play”. It was originally written in upper case, although it now generally appears in lower case. It is otherwise known as the Swedish natural method or simply the Swedish method.

== Modern definition and utility ==
Fartlek has been described as a “relatively unscientific blending” of continuous training—whose forms include long slow distance training—with its steady pace of moderate-high intensity aerobic intensity (where by this is implied a level of activity at 60–80% VO_{2max}) and interval training, with its "spacing of [more intense] exercise and rest intervals." Hence, in its widely adapted contemporary forms, Fartlek training can simply be described as alternating periods of faster and slower exercise (i.e., running), intermixed. In this adaptation of these other well-characterized training methods, the interplay between the effort (exercise) and recovery (relief) are not systematically manipulated; instead, the athlete and coach determine the interplay "based on 'how it feels'" during the training. To some extent, in distinction to the earliest forms of Fartlek, its evolution has taken it further in directions away from the track, toward natural outdoor terrain, including both “level and hilly terrain.”

From the perspective of exercise physiology,

[w]hen properly applied, [a Fartlek training approach] overloads one or all of the energy systems... [and so] provides ideal general conditioning and off-season training strategies ... [adding] freedom and variety to workouts.

In relation to continuous and interval training methods, these same authors note that there is “[i]nsufficient evidence ... proclaiming superiority of any specific training method to improve aerobic capacity and associated physiologic variables ... Each form of training produces success.” They go on to argue that, “[o]ne can probably use the various training methods interchangeably, particularly to modify training and achieve a more psychologically pleasing exercise or training regimen.”

== History ==
=== Gösta Holmér ===
Swedish coach Gösta Holmér developed Fartlek in the 1930s; since then, many runners and running coaches have adopted it. It was designed for the Swedish cross country running teams, which had been beaten throughout the 1920s by Paavo Nurmi and long time rivals the Finnish team. Holmér's new training plan applied a faster-than-race training pace and innovated by mixing speed work and stamina training into one session. Like interval training, it involves running at speeds far higher than normal for short periods. Where Fartlek differs from interval sessions is in the fact that these short bursts of pace occur within a continuous long run. The short, fast runs alternate with longer periods of easier running.

=== Early uses of Fartlek ===
In the late 1930s, the decade following Finnish runners' supremacy under Paavo Nurmi, Gosta Holmer was the national coach for Sweden (see Gösta Holmér article), and he devised an approach that has been called as "innovative as any idea in athletics' history", introducing "faster-than-race-pace, simultaneous speed/endurance training" which he termed "Fartlek" (with a capital "f"), meaning "speed play". In Holmér's hands, the sustainable speed of his runners was not achieved through Fartlek workouts alone; his training regimen included "[r]epeat track workouts, tempo runs and time trials ... alternated or combined with Fartlek" through each training week. For his Swedish runners, which were world-class, the original Fartlek workout has been described as "a total of 12 kilometres running[,] with up to 5,000 metres ... being at faster than race pace." Described by another, a typical workout might be "seven total miles of running with 4,000 or 5,000 meters worth of lickety-splits [faster-paced intervals], from 40-meter sprints to upwards of 2,400-meter pick-ups".

Holmer used the technique on a 3 kilometres (2 mi) forest loop where he instructed Gunder Haegg and Arne Anderson to run fast when the instinct moved them and slower to recover. He credited Fartlek as the reason they ran near 4:01 for the mile on various occasions.

Fartlek training was, by one account, introduced in the United States, in the 1940s. By the 1960s, in the hands of Doris Brown Heritage, an inductee of the Track and Field Hall of Fame and running coach at Seattle Pacific University, her Fartlek workouts had become assigned to 20-minute sessions beginning and ending with mile runs, between which were sandwiched an unstructured intermix of "40 to 200-yard sprints and five to seven minute segment 'perceived exertions'". In her university coaching, her cross country and track runners faced these, as well as "lots of short sprints ... [and] five to seven minute runs".

At Portsea on the Australian shore, at a "rough and tumble training resort", Percy Cerutty had, through the 1950s and into the 1960s, applied forms of Fartlek focusing on the freedom of training variations it allowed; his forms were "deeper and steeper", involving "20 percent beach running in heavy sand, 10 percent repetitions [running] up dunes ... and the remainder ... sprints, jogs and middle-distance runs" akin to those introduced by Holmér, which he led "along cliff top paths ... [and] seashore and dirt roads." The work on the dunes was noteworthy in that some were "as high as 80 feet [24 m] and as steeply graded as the stairs up the Statue of Liberty". (Quoting sprint champion Joe Schatzle, Sr., Runner's World notes that "Cerruty ... took training to places no one ever thought of before—and few have thought about since.") For Australian runners training at Portsea, which for some comprised half of their yearly schedules, the training was without any traditional, structured track work. In the early 1960s, innovative and highly regarded distance coaches such as New Zealander Arthur Lydiard adapted Holmér's training approach, and like Cerutty, introduced Fartlek-type workouts (alongside his long slow distance methods), again "over both flat and varied trails", using markers to indicate points at which sprint and middle-distance changes in pace were to be made. As described by Joe Rogers, who coached at Ball State University and West Point, "[t]he Swedes used ... pine needle forest trails ... terrain training, and hilly Fartlek courses ... [but] primarily, it was on level paths", whereas Lydiard used both flat and graded elements in his training: "On the flats, athletes changed paces at markers. The hill courses had built-in stressors."

==== Example session ====
This is the first session that was designed by Gösta Holmér for a cross-country (multi-terrain) runner. It is an example of what a Fartlek session might look like—although Fartlek sessions should be designed for an athlete's own event or sport, as well as catering to their individual needs.

According to this source, sessions should be at an intensity that causes the athlete to work at 60% to 80% of his or her maximum heart rate. This should mean that the body will not experience too much discomfort while exercising. An athlete should also include a good warm up at the beginning of the session, and a cool down at the end of the session, to improve performance, minimize post-workout muscle soreness, and decrease the chances of injury and for other reasons. An example of a training session is:

- Warm up: easy running for 5 to 10 minutes.
- 1 minute on, 2 minutes off, alternating fast and easy pace (3–4 times)
- Cool down: 10 minutes at an easy pace

== Fartlek variations ==
=== Major forms ===
==== Mona Fartlek ====
Australian distance runner Steve Moneghetti lends his nickname to a training workout "well known ... in Australia", which was "devised by his ... coach Chris Wardlaw ... a dual Olympian". The workout, which provides a "way to inject ... speed" into a run, has been described as a "cut-down ladder-Fartlek", and was a track workout in its original design but is suited to any continuous course. The workout was designed to fit a 20-minute session, accompanied by a requisite warmup and cooldown, e.g., of half the training length (i.e., ca. 10-minutes each). It pairs periods of effort and recovery, specifically consisting of two 90-second efforts (each followed by the same length of recovery), with the same pattern then being followed for four efforts of 60 seconds, four efforts of 30 seconds, and four efforts of 15 seconds. A stated assumption of the workout is that as the period of effort shortens, the intensity (pace) of the effort increases, although actual workouts are tailored to individual runners' needs (i.e., there is "no hard and fast rule"). In one description of the workout, beginning pace during the effort portions is intended to fall about at the runners "5K pace", with subsequent shorter intervals being taken at faster pace as the runner is able, and with recoveries varying from walking and easy jogging for newer and other runners needing "more recovery between hard efforts", to half-marathon/marathon "race pace recovery" or 5K/10K race pace "moderate recovery" for more experienced runners. In more sophisticated presentations, the workout is adapted to particular periods of a runner's "training year":

[F]or example ... in a base building period ... the efforts remain completely aerobic, but very near the top of the anaerobic threshold. The recoveries are floats, rather than easy jogging. During this [period], the run more resembles a tempo run with a higher level of intensity than what a tempo effort in one [continuous] strong effort can typically offer. During the quality [periods] of training, the recoveries can be a jog, while the efforts delve into the anaerobic realm. The efforts should be done by feel and can range in ... pace from 1500m ... to 10k race pace, again depending on the time of year.

=== Other forms ===
Three speeds version

In order to add more variety and complexity, runners can add another speed into the run. Within any run, "there is no reason why three different paces should not be included." This would change a normal Fartlek by doing a jog, run, and a full-out sprint.

Mailbox version

Runners hypothetically "run hard for two mailboxes, recover for three, run hard for three, recover for two." When executing this type, the runner continues like this for the allotted time or distance determined.

Dog park version

Runners speed up when they get close to a dog in order to pass them; after passing the dog, they would then slow down for the recovery period.

Music version

Many runners use music while they run. Runners can use their music as a template for their Fartlek run by changing their speed according to different parts of a song. For example, they can speed up during the chorus and slow down for the rest of the song.

Popular beginner's description

Fartlek can simply include periods of jogging combined with short periods of sprinting, or, for beginners, walking combined with jogging; e.g., a person may be asked to "sprint all out from one light pole to the next, jog to the corner, give a medium effort for a couple of blocks, jog between four light poles and sprint to a stop sign, and so on", until the desired distance or running time is reached."

== Benefits ==
=== Easily adjustable ===
Since the workout is easily manipulated, "Fartlek training allows you to add an endless variety of intervals to your aerobic workouts, which helps to keep you stimulated." Variety can be achieved by changing the amount of distance, time, fast bursts, recovery periods, and even the time at which one does each component.

=== Race day readiness ===
For competitive runners, Fartleks and other types of interval runs are key for race day readiness. The alternating speeds that are the defining point of Fartleks allow runners to work "both the aerobic and anaerobic training systems while simulating the ebb and flow nature of competitive running."

=== Body strengthening ===
Fartleks keep runners' bodies in top shape so that they can keep racing. Putting Fartlek runs in a workout routine keeps "muscles, tendons, nerves, etc. used in running going at top capacity," keeping their bodies strong enough to maintain the mechanics of racing.

=== Fat burn ===
By alternating the "intensity of your workouts, you will burn more calories than you would by keeping a steady pace." While running, the runner's body uses a combination of carbohydrates and fat, with relatively more carbohydrates metabolized at faster speeds and relatively more fat the longer the workout lasts. A Fartlek workout allows the body to adapt to using both sources of energy, with the desired adaptation towards fat metabolism occurring during slower periods. In addition, varying speeds improves cardiovascular endurance slightly more than running at a steady pace for the same time and total distance.

=== Sports training variability ===
Fartleks can be specially tailored to fit the needs of different types of athletes. An example is basketball, where "you must exert maximum effort while running a fast break, while you exert very little effort while standing at the foul line." It is possible to alter the type and timing of the Fartlek in order to mimic the intensity of an average basketball game. This can be done for other sports such as tennis, rugby, soccer, and football as well.

== Compared to other routines ==
Other routines include traditional interval training, and ladder and tempo runs. These workouts have some similarities to Fartlek routines, but are distinguished from them and one from another by slight differences.

=== Interval runs ===
Intervals "are short, intense efforts followed by equal or slightly longer recovery time." By the end of a short burst of speed, the runner is barely able to keep up that pace. Unlike Fartleks, interval runs are much more structured; usually running the fast and slow spurts at exact times or distances. Interval runs and tempo runs differ in the fact that tempo runs maintain a faster pace for a set amount of time, while interval runs consist of alternating between sprints and slow sections instead of maintaining one speed.

=== Ladders ===
Ladders are defined as "a speed workout in which the fast parts vary in length." Athletes run a short time or distance at a hard pace, then work that time/distance up and back down with timed breaks in between. The structure of ladder workouts is similar to interval training, but the two differ in that the work periods vary in time or distance in ladder training. The fact that the portions performed at the faster speed vary in length or time mirrors Fartlek runs.

=== Tempo runs ===
Tempo runs are typically run for 20 to 25 minutes at a 6 or 7 RPE (out of 10). This exercise is "like an Oreo cookie, with the warmup and cooldown as the cookie, and a run at an effort at or slightly above your anaerobic threshold (the place where your body shifts to using more glycogen for energy) as the filling." Runners warm up at a slow and steady pace, run harder than they would on a normal distance jog for an allotted amount of time, and then do a cool down with a very similar speed to the warm-up.

== See also ==
- High-intensity interval training
- Hypoventilation training
- Long-distance running
- Long slow distance
