= Tabata =

Tabata may refer to:

- Tabata (ward), an administrative ward in Dar es Salaam Region, Tanzania
- Tabata (surname), a Japanese surname
- Tabata Station (Nagano), Nagano Prefecture
- Tabata Station (Tokyo), Tokyo
- Tabata method, a form of high-intensity interval training
