= Michael McCastle =

American endurance athlete

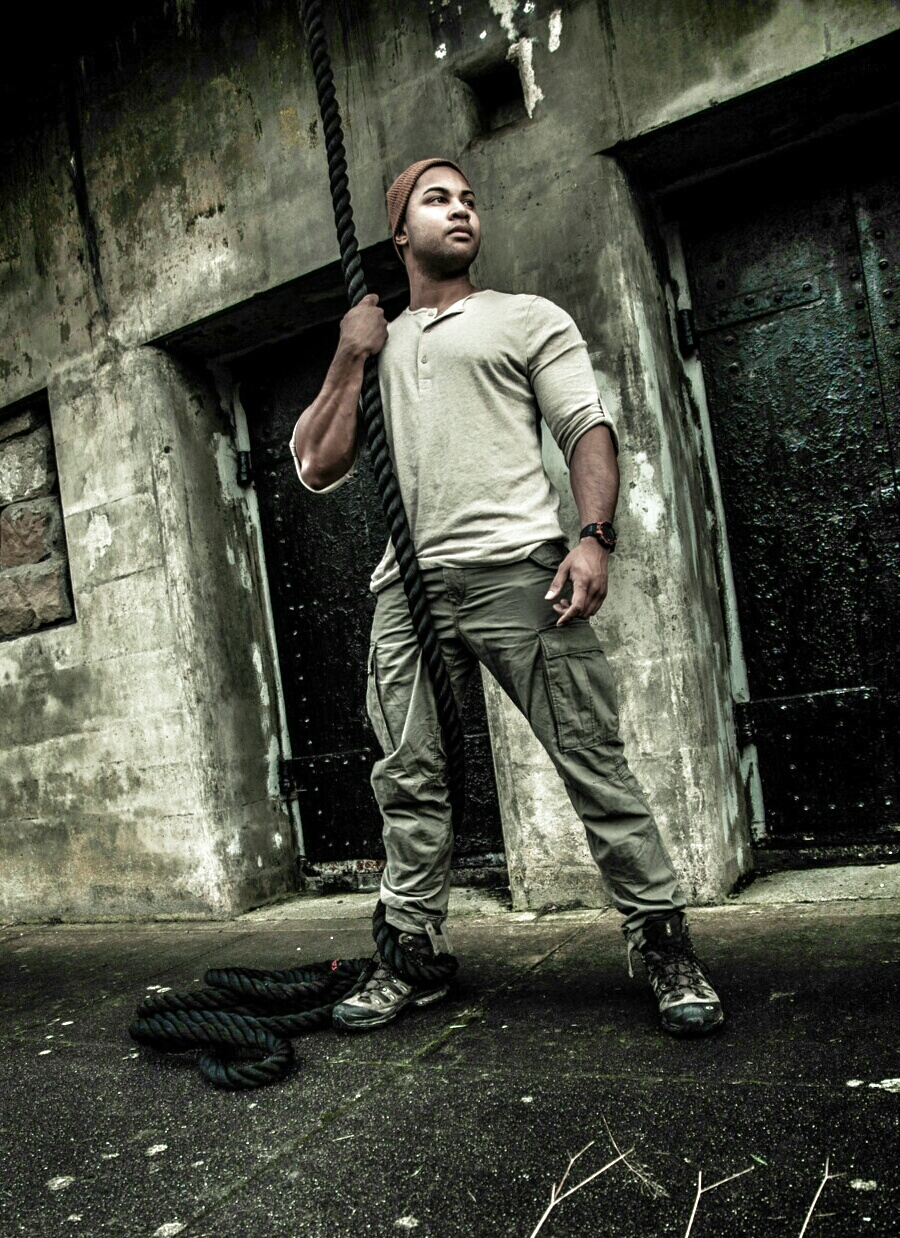
- Michael McCastle, founder of Twelve Labors Project.
- Occupation: Endurance athlete
- Known for: World record holder
- Website: Project Website

Michael McCastle is an American endurance athlete, performance coach and philanthropist. He is the current world record holder for the number of pull-ups completed in 24 hours (5,804) while wearing a 30 lb pack. He is the founder of the Twelve Labors Project, a philanthropic organization in which McCastle performs feats of strength and endurance to raise awareness for causes. McCastle is also an air traffic controller and a former petty officer in the United States Navy.

== Endurance feats ==
McCastle attempted his first endurance feat in 2014 when he sought to break the world record for the most pull-ups completed in a 24-hour period. He decided to attempt the feat while recovering from an ACL injury suffered in Naval Special Warfare Preparatory School portion of the Navy SEALs training pipeline. The 24-hour pull-up record at the time of McCastle's first attempt was 4,030. After he had completed around 2,300, McCastle suffered muscle tears in his forearms and biceps as well as rhabdomyolysis. He managed to finish 3,202 pull-ups in 19 hours before quitting due to injury. He spent two days in the hospital recovering. Through this feat, McCastle helped raise $9,600 for the Wounded Warrior Project.

His next feat took place in December 2014 and involved flipping a 250-pound truck tire 13 miles, attempting the feat one day after he lost his father. The initial plan was for McCastle to flip the tire along a 13-mile stretch of road where he was stationed Oak Harbor, Washington. He could not secure the requisite municipal permits for the journey and ended up flipping the tire in a parking lot. The stretch of pavement was 500 feet, and McCastle flipped the tire across that stretch 137 times to equal 13 miles. The feat took around 10 hours to complete. In the process, McCastle raised $700 for the Wounded Warrior Project. The feat is generally considered a world record for the longest distance traveled while flipping a 250-pound truck tire.

In May 2015, McCastle successfully climbed 29,029 feet (the equivalent of climbing to the top of Mount Everest) by scaling a 20-foot rope 1,450 times in under 27 hours. McCastle's goal was to raise $20,000 for the Michael J. Fox Foundation for Parkinson's Research. McCastle had lost his father to Parkinson's a few months earlier. Prior to the rope climb, McCastle also completed a 50k run for cancer research.

In September 2015, McCastle announced that he would be attempting the 24-hour pull-up record again. During this attempt, McCastle wore a 30-pound pack on his back to represent the burden of wounded soldiers. This feat was performed to raise funds and awareness for Operation Enduring Warrior, a charity and advocacy group for wounded soldiers. McCastle surpassed the record of 5,801 pull-ups by three reps and is the current world record holder at 5,804 pull-ups in a 24-hour period.

== Personal life ==
McCastle was driven to join the Navy after the September 11 attacks. He has been deployed around the world and currently works as an air traffic controller at the Naval Air Station Whidbey Island in Washington, with a rank of petty officer, first class. He is also the founder of the Twelve Labors Project, which is named in reference to the Twelve Labors of Hercules. The organization's goal is to raise awareness and funds for a variety of causes through the completion of various feats of strength and endurance.
