= Excess post-exercise oxygen consumption =

Increased rate of oxygen intake following strenuous activity

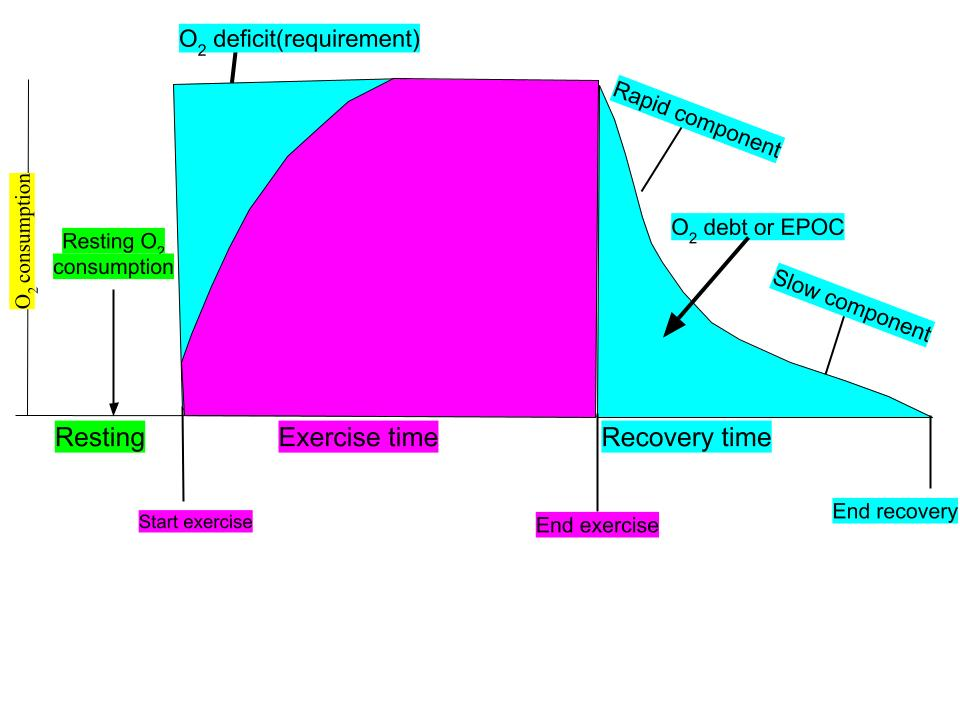
Illustration of the old "oxygen debt" theory

Excess post-exercise oxygen consumption (EPOC, informally called afterburn) is a measurably increased rate of oxygen intake following strenuous activity. In historical contexts the term "oxygen debt" was popularized to explain or perhaps attempt to quantify anaerobic energy expenditure, particularly as regards lactic acid/lactate metabolism; in fact, the term "oxygen debt" is still widely used to this day. However, direct and indirect calorimeter experiments have definitively disproven any association of lactate metabolism as causal to an elevated oxygen uptake.

In recovery, oxygen (EPOC) is used in the processes that restore the body to a resting state and adapt it to the exercise just performed. These include: hormone balancing, replenishment of fuel stores, cellular repair, innervation, and anabolism. Post-exercise oxygen consumption replenishes the phosphagen system. New ATP is synthesized and some of this ATP donates phosphate groups to creatine until ATP and creatine levels are back to resting state levels again. Another use of EPOC is to fuel the body’s increased metabolism from the increase in body temperature which occurs during exercise.

EPOC is accompanied by an elevated consumption of fuel. In response to exercise, fat stores are broken down and free fatty acids (FFA) are released into the blood stream. In recovery, the direct oxidation of free fatty acids as fuel and the energy consuming re-conversion of FFAs back into fat stores both take place.

== Duration of the effect ==
The EPOC effect is greatest soon after the exercise is completed and decays to a lower level over time. One experiment, involving exertion above baseline, found EPOC increasing metabolic rate to an excess level that decays to 13% three hours after exercise, and 4% after 16 hours, for the studied exercise dose. Another study, specifically designed to test whether the effect existed for more than 16 hours, conducted tests for 48 hours after the conclusion of the exercise and found measurable effects existed up to the 38-hour post-exercise measurement, for the studied exercise dose.

== Size of the EPOC effect ==
Studies show that the EPOC effect exists after both aerobic exercise and anaerobic exercise. In a 1992 Purdue study, results showed that high intensity, anaerobic type exercise resulted in a significantly greater magnitude of EPOC than aerobic exercise of equal work output. For exercise regimens of comparable duration and intensity, aerobic exercise burns more calories during the exercise itself, but the difference is partly offset by the higher increase in caloric expenditure that occurs during the EPOC phase after anaerobic exercise. Anaerobic exercise in the form of high-intensity interval training was also found in one study to result in greater loss of subcutaneous fat, even though the subjects expended fewer than half as many calories during exercise. Whether this result was caused by the EPOC effect has not been established, and the caloric content of the participants' diet was not controlled during this particular study period.

Most researchers use a measure of EPOC as a natural part of the quantification or measurement of exercise and recovery energy expenditure; to others this is not deemed necessary. After a single bout or set of weight lifting, Scott et al. found considerable contributions of EPOC to total energy expenditure. In their 2004 survey of the relevant literature, Meirelles and Gomes found: "In summary, EPOC resulting from a single resistance exercise session (i.e., many lifts) does not represent a great impact on energy balance; however, its cumulative effect may be relevant". This is echoed by Reynolds and Kravitz in their survey of the literature where they remarked: "the overall weight-control benefits of EPOC, for men and women, from participation in resistance exercise occur over a significant time period, since kilocalories are expended at a low rate in the individual post-exercise sessions."

The EPOC effect clearly increases with the intensity of the exercise, and (at least in the case of aerobic exercise, perhaps also for anaerobic) the duration of the exercise.

Studies comparing intermittent and continuous exercise consistently show a greater EPOC response for higher intensity, intermittent exercise.

== See also ==
- High-intensity interval training
- Exercise physiology
- Yo-yo effect
