= Fitness Blender =

Exercise video content publisher

- Industry: Fitness
- Founded: 2009; 17 years ago
- Founder: Kelli and Daniel Segars
- Headquarters: United States
- Products: Fitness videos

Fitness Blender is an American digital fitness content publisher founded by personal trainers Kelli and Daniel Segars. The company offers free and paid at-home exercise videos through their website and YouTube channel. In 2017, it was the most-watched fitness channel on YouTube.

== History ==
Fitness Blender was founded in 2009 as a YouTube channel by personal trainers and fitness instructors Daniel and Kelli Segars with the goal to create a minimalistic alternative to other online fitness brands.

== Products ==
Fitness Blender offers individual workouts and workout plans. Workout formats include high intensity interval training (HIIT), bodyweight workouts, strength training routines, and other offerings. The company offers free content as well as additional content through a paid membership program called FB Plus.

== Fitness Blender Plus ==
Fitness Blender Plus is an expanded version of Fitness Blender's standard free membership. It offers users an ad-free interface on its website and videos. This service includes features such as the ability to track progress, enter and monitor custom workouts, and access to a larger selection of workouts that are exclusive to FB Plus subscribers. Additionally, it provides tools like a workout selection feature, statistics for tracking activities, exclusive content, challenges, and video tags.

== Trainers ==
Starting in 2021, Fitness Blender began adding additional trainers to their lineup.

Name	Role
Kelli	Certified Personal Trainer
Daniel	Certified Personal Trainer
Tasha	Certified Personal Trainer
Kayla	Doctor of Physical Therapy
Amanda	Doctor of Physical Therapy
Marina	Registered Yoga Teacher
Erica	Certified Personal Trainer
Nicole	Certified Personal Trainer
Aly	Registered Yoga Teacher
Brian	Certified Personal Trainer
Patrice	Certified Personal Trainer
