= Latin Jam Workout =

Latin Jam Workout is a Latin Dance Fitness Program created by professional athlete and choreographer JP Santana. Founded in 2007 in Los Angeles, California, Latin Jam Workout combines techno and Latin music with dance and aerobic movements. It is a fusion of Latin dance steps such as Salsa, Merengue, Raeggaeton, Cumbia, Samba, Soca, Belly-Dancing and the faster-paced rhythms of Pop and Techno.

Latin Jam Workout is taught in fitness venues, gyms, dance studios, schools and community centers by certified instructors.

== Program ==
Classes usually run one hour, divided into an initial 15-minute warm-up, a core segment and a final cool-down. Latin Jam classes use an exclusive musical mix. The warm-up features fast-paced pop and techno beats to raise body temperature and heart rate, while the core part of the class features a mix of fast and slow rhythms to combine aerobic and resistance training.

== History ==
Latin Jam Workout was created by JP Santana in Los Angeles, in 2009. Since then, this fitness program has been introduced to Northern California, Utah, Colorado and Nevada. Santana created this concept to provide a complete body work-out designed to assist with weight loss with the entertainment of Latin Music that has proven to be successful in his native Colombia as well as other countries in Latin America.
