= Physical activity =

Any voluntarily bodily motion that requires energy expenditure

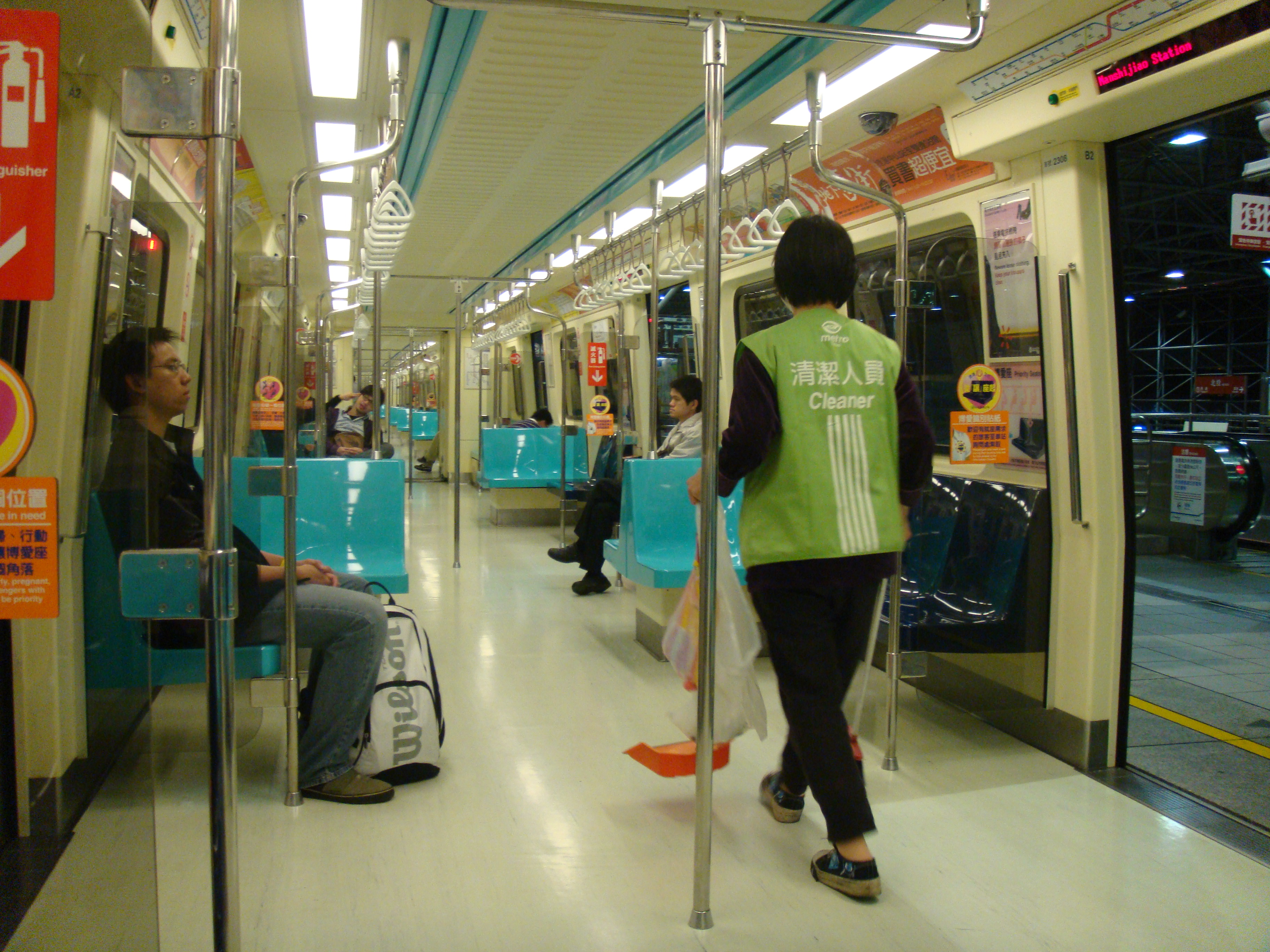
Physical activity is not just exercise. It includes other activities that involve movement; for example, cleaning, running, active transport etc.

Physical activity is defined as any movement produced by skeletal muscles that requires energy expenditure. Physical activity encompasses all activities, at any intensity, performed during any time of day or night. It includes both voluntary exercise and incidental activity integrated into the daily routine. This integrated activity may not be planned, structured, repetitive or purposeful for the improvement of physical fitness, and may include activities such as walking to the local shop, cleaning, working and using active transport. Lack of physical activity is associated with a range of negative health outcomes, whereas increased physical activity can improve physical and mental health, as well as cognitive and cardiovascular health. There are at least eight investments that work to increase population-level physical activity, including whole-of-school programmes, active transport, active urban design, healthcare, public education and mass media, sport for all, workplaces and community-wide programmes. Physical activity increases energy expenditure and is a key regulator in controlling body weight (see Summermatter cycle for more). In human beings, differences among individuals in the amount of physical activity have a substantial genetic basis.

== Terminology misconception ==
"Exercise" and "physical activity" are frequently used interchangeably and generally refer to physical activity performed during leisure time with the primary purpose of improving or maintaining physical fitness, physical performance, or health. However, physical activity is not exactly the same concept as exercise. Exercise is defined as a subcategory of physical activity that is planned, structured, repetitive, and purposeful in the sense that the improvement or maintenance of one or more components of physical fitness is the objective. Conversely, physical activity includes exercise but may also be unplanned, unstructured, random, and non-purposeful, and may be carried out for a multitude of reasons.

A 2021 study shows that people who begin successful physical activity programmes maintain much of it for at least three months.

== Intensity ==
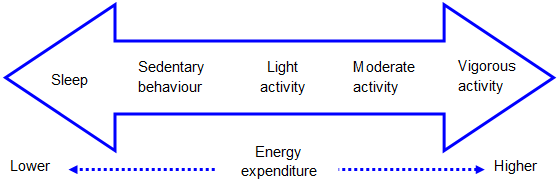
Intensity of physical activities on a continuum from sedentary behavior to vigorous physical activity.

Physical activity can be at any intensity, ranging from a little muscle twitch to a full-out sprint. Physical activity can be thought of as a continuum in practice, ranging from inactive lifestyles to high-intensity exercises. Intensities are broadly categorized according to energy expenditure using a standard measure of intensity, metabolic equivalents (METs). The broad categories are sedentary behavior, light activity, moderate activity, and vigorous activity.

=== Example activities at each intensity ===
The following table documents some examples of physical activities at each intensity level. Depending on the individual and the activity involved, activities may overlap intensity categories or change categories completely.

Intensity	Example Activities
Sedentary Behavior	Sitting, lying
Standing	Standing still
Light Physical Activity (LPA)	Slow walking, shuffling around the house
Moderate Physical Activity (MPA)	Brisk walking, jogging, light swimming, stair climbing
Vigorous Physical Activity (VPA)	Fast running, fast cycling, sprinting

== Physical activity as prevention and therapy ==
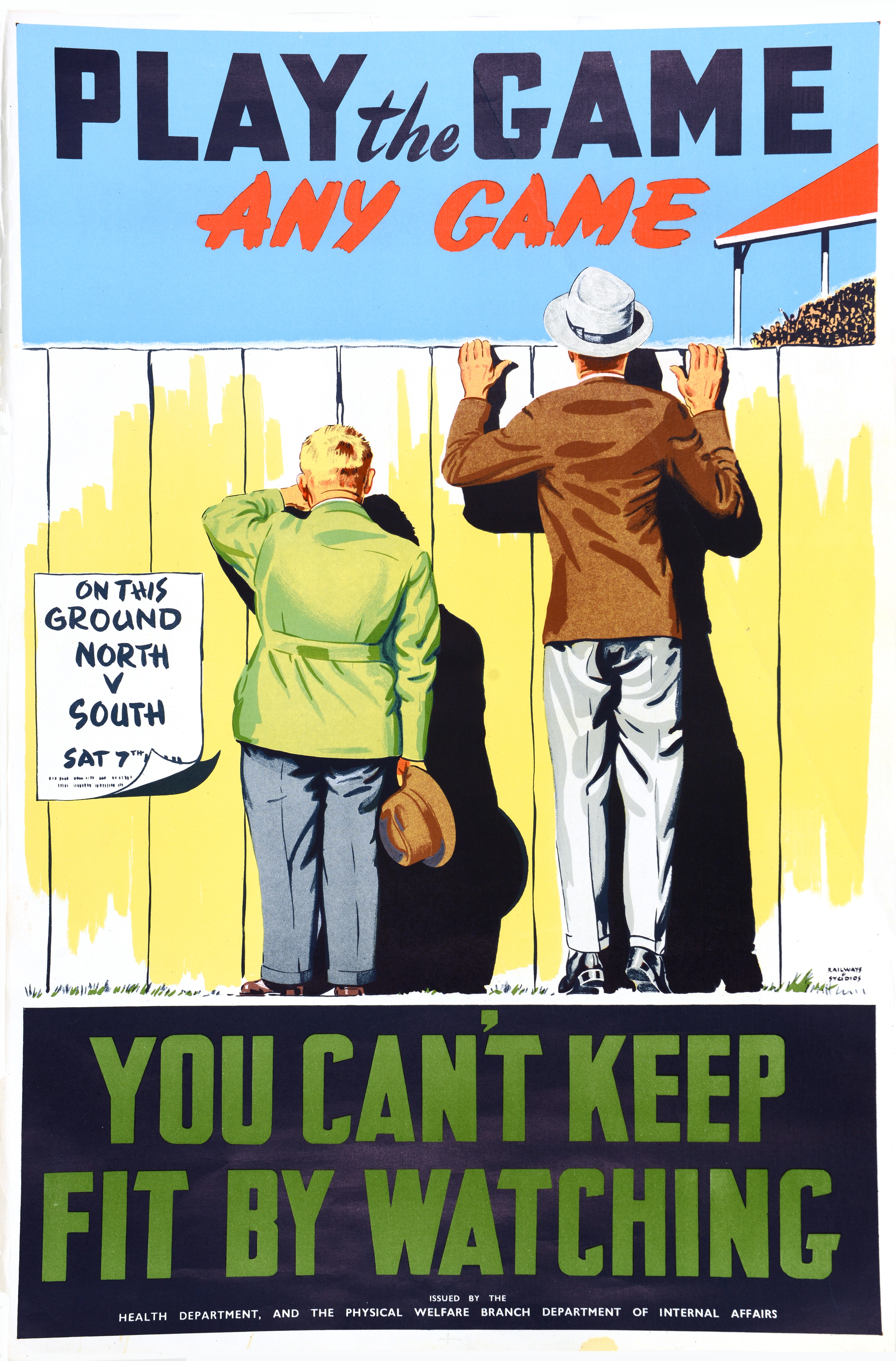
Inactivity prevention poster: "Play the game, any game. You can't keep fit by watching." (New Zealand, 1950s)

Physical activity is a cornerstone of public health and prevention of non-communicable disease. Physical inactivity has been found to cause a wide range of non-communicable diseases, including coronary heart disease, stroke, diabetes mellitus and depression. An analysis of the healthcare costs of non-communicable diseases and mental illness attributable to physical inactivity for 2020–30 found that 500 million new cases of disease will occur globally between 2020 and 2030 if physical activity remains at today's levels. This corresponds to more than US$300 billion in treatment costs

As of 2024, 31% of adults and 80% of adolescents do not meet the recommended levels of physical activity.

Many studies have demonstrated the potential beneficial effects of physical activity on the prevention and therapy of many disorders such as Obesity and Irritable bowel syndrome Physical activity has been shown to reduce anxiety as a condition (individual physical exercise, without continuity), anxiety as a personality trait (continuous performance, "exercise" of certain physical activities), psycho-physiological signs of anxiety - blood pressure and heart rate (moderate physical activity can lead to a decrease in the intensity of short-term physiological reactivity and encourage recovery from short-term physiological stressors (Biddle et al., 2000)). Additionally, Home-based exercise is proven to be associated with family well-being and resilience, and exercising with family members may produce stronger effects. For people with a severe depressive episode and anxiety disorder, long and short walks proved to be the most effective; for people with substance abuse disorders, bipolar disorder and frequent psychotic decompensation, "strenuous" gymnastics and riding proved to be the most effective. Reducing workplace-base sitting has been shown to address sedentary behaviour in workplace. However, there are few interventions that are cost-effective in reducing occupational sitting time. A study estimated the annual value of nature-based PA conducted in England in 2019 in terms of avoided healthcare and societal costs of six non-communicable diseases (ischaemic heart disease, ischaemic stroke, type 2 diabetes, colon cancer, breast cancer and major depressive disorder) at £108.7million.

== Physical activities during leisure and clusters of different forms of meaningfulness ==
Model over the field of physical activity in terms of clusters of movement cultures with different forms of meaningfulness. From: Lundvall & Schantz 2013.

Different forms of physical activity in leisure time can be divided into different clusters of activities that have a common denominator in the form of type of meaningfulness, se model to the right (Lundvall & Schantz 2013).

These separate forms of meaningfulness consist of (i) competition and championship, (ii) nature encounters, (iii) aesthetic-expressive, (iv) fitness gymnastics and play, (v) everyday exercise and (vi) five different basic forms of physical training (aerobic, anaerobic, strength, flexibility and coordination training).

How these different clusters have been treated over time from 1813 to today in a context of teacher training for physical education in the Swedish school system has been described by the Swedish professors in human movement science Suzanne Lundvall & Peter Schantz (2013).

== Recommendations for physical activity (including sleep and sedentary behavior) ==
=== Global recommendations ===
The World Health Organization recommend the following:

==== Adults aged 18–64 ====
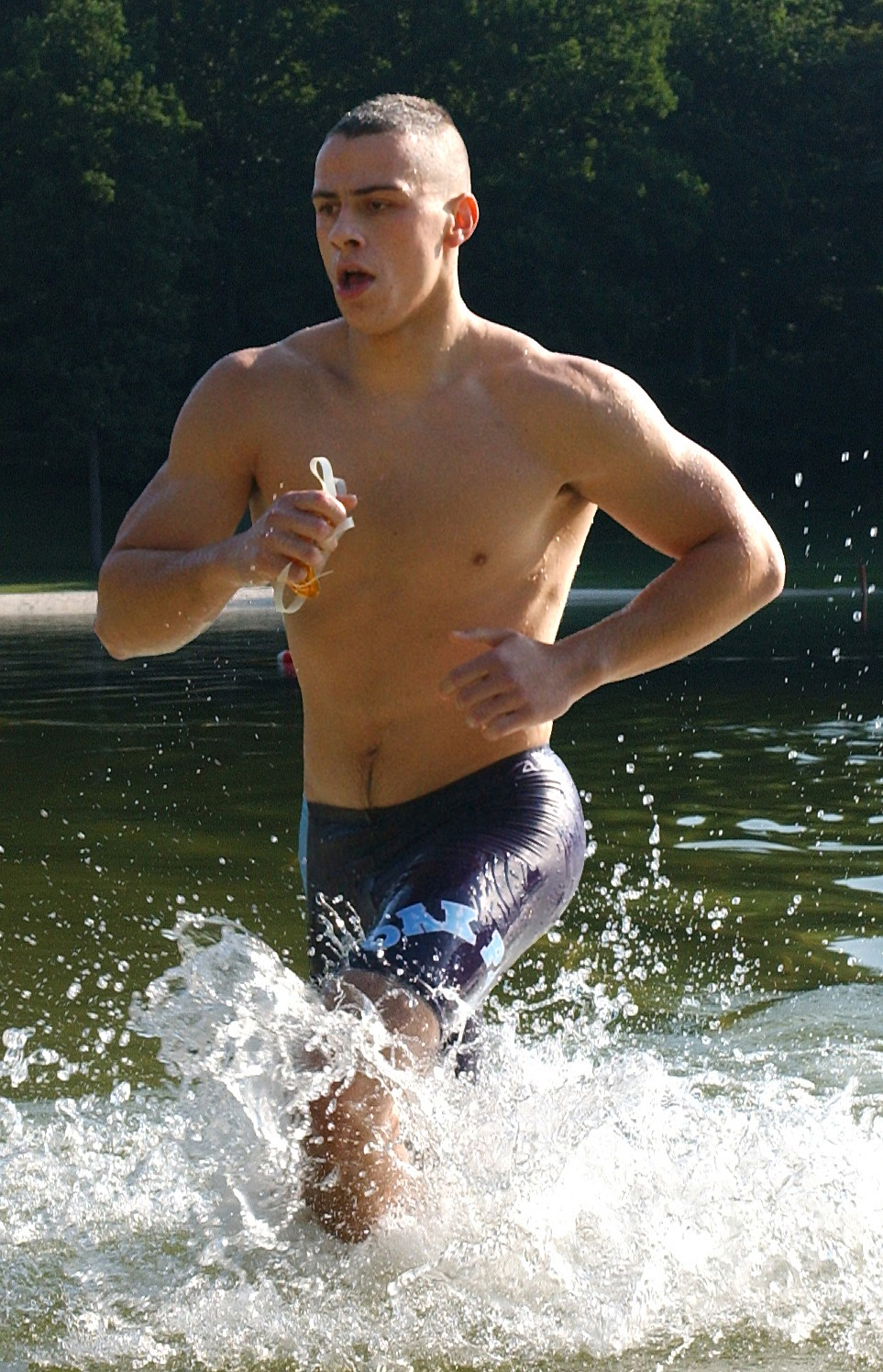
Running in water

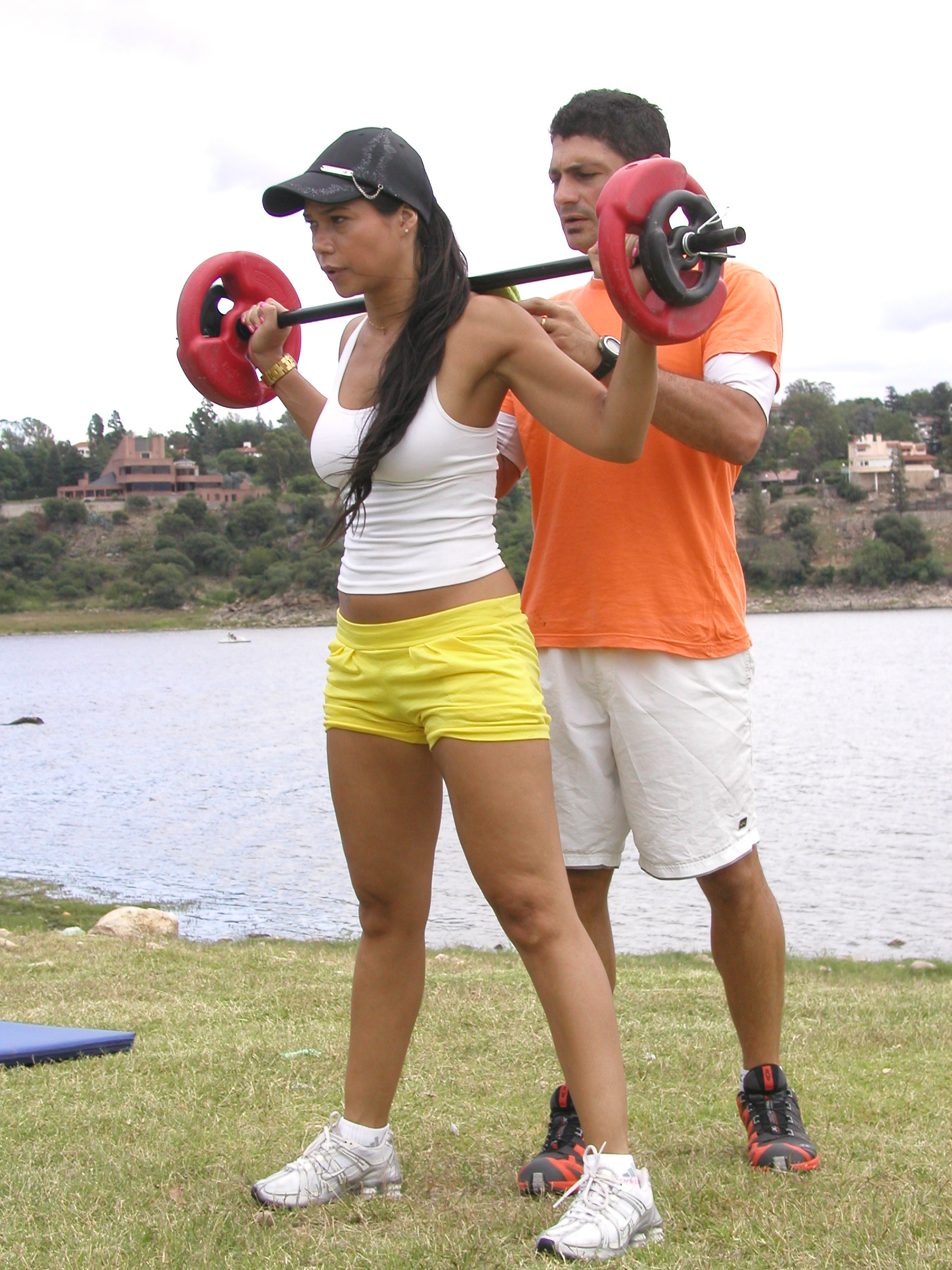
Weight training

1. Adults aged 18–64 should do at least 150 minutes of moderate-intensity aerobic physical activity throughout the week or do at least 75 minutes of vigorous-intensity aerobic physical activity throughout the week or an equivalent combination of moderate- and vigorous-intensity activity.

2. Aerobic activity should be performed in bouts of at least 10 minutes duration.

3. For additional health benefits, adults should increase their moderate-intensity aerobic physical activity to 300 minutes per week, or engage in 150 minutes of vigorous-intensity aerobic physical activity per week, or an equivalent combination of moderate- and vigorous-intensity activity.

4. Muscle-strengthening activities should be done involving major muscle groups on 2 or more days a week.

==== Adults aged 65+ ====
1. Adults aged 65 years and above should do at least 150 minutes of moderate-intensity aerobic physical activity throughout the week or do at least 75 minutes of vigorous-intensity aerobic physical activity throughout the week or an equivalent combination of moderate- and vigorous-intensity activity.

2. Aerobic activity should be performed in bouts of at least 10 minutes duration.

3. For additional health benefits, adults aged 65 years and above should increase their moderate-intensity aerobic physical activity to 300 minutes per week, or engage in 150 minutes of vigorous-intensity aerobic physical activity per week, or an equivalent combination of moderate-and vigorous-intensity activity.

4. Adults of this age group, with poor mobility, should perform physical activity to enhance balance and prevent falls on 3 or more days per week.

5. Muscle-strengthening activities should be done involving major muscle groups, on 2 or more days a week.

6. When adults of this age group cannot do the recommended amounts of physical activity due to health conditions, they should be as physically active as their abilities and conditions allow.

==== Children and Adolescents aged 5–17 ====
1. Children and youth aged 5–17 should accumulate at least 60 minutes of moderate- to vigorous-intensity physical activity daily.

2. Amounts of physical activity greater than 60 minutes provide additional health benefits.

=== Country-level recommendations ===
Australia, New Zealand, the United Kingdom, Canada, The Netherlands and the United States are among the countries that have issued physical activity recommendations.

=== Predictors of physical activity levels ===
The amount of physical activity conducted by a population—and by extension the proportion of that population reaching guidelines or other specified thresholds—is dictated by several factors including demographics (e.g., age, sex, ethnicity), population health status, cultural aspects, and the state of the environment itself (e.g. infrastructure that affords physical activity). Demographic groups can also intersect, increasing risk to individuals who are both female and socially disadvantaged for example.

Studies have shown that as the availability of natural environments (e.g., parks, woodlands, inland waters, coasts) increases, more leisure-time physical activity such as walking and cycling are reported. Meteorological conditions have been found to predict physical activity differently in different types of environment. For example, in a large population-based study in England, higher air temperatures and lower wind speeds were associated with increased physical activity.

Globally, in 2016, according to a pooled analysis of 298 population-based surveys, around 81% of students aged 11–17 years were insufficiently physically active. The region with the highest prevalence of insufficient activity in 2016 was high-income Asia Pacific.

=== Health effects ===
Death rate due to low physical activity

Regular physical activity is associated with a wide range of health benefits. According to the World Health Organization's 2020 guidelines, physical activity reduces the risk of all-cause mortality, cardiovascular disease, hypertension, type 2 diabetes, and several cancers, while also improving mental health, cognitive function, and sleep quality. Higher levels of physical activity are generally associated with greater health benefits, although even small increases in activity among inactive individuals provide measurable improvements in health outcomes.

Environmental factors such as air pollution may modify these health benefits. A 2025 systematic review and meta-analysis involving over 1.5 million adults found that while leisure-time physical activity was associated with reduced mortality across all levels of exposure, the magnitude of this benefit was attenuated at higher concentrations of fine particulate matter (PM_{2.5}). Specifically, the reduction in mortality risk was approximately 30% at PM_{2.5} concentrations below 25 μg/m^{3}, compared with around 12–15% at higher concentrations.

== As a health indicator ==
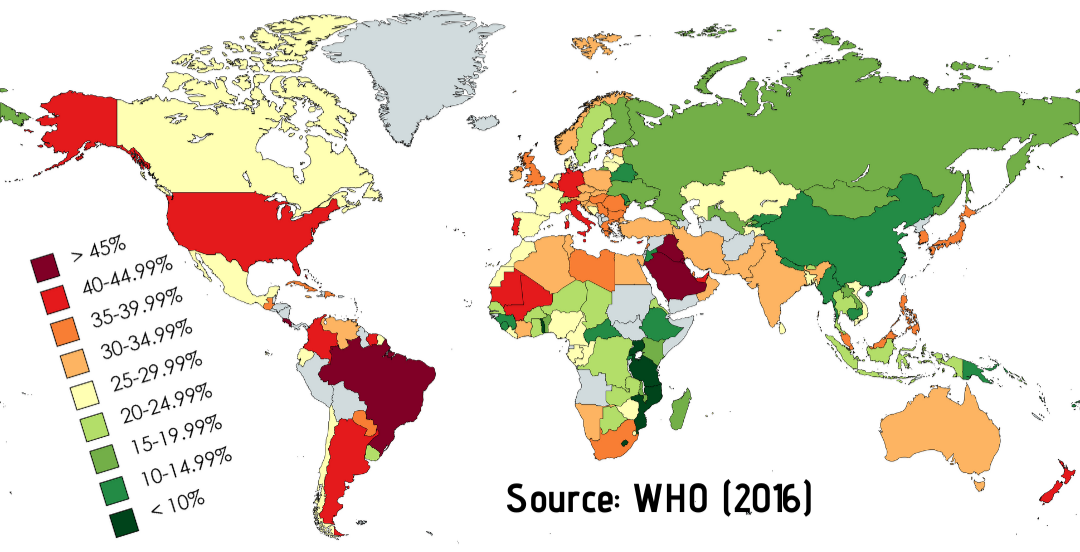
Insufficient physical activity among adults (2016)

Physical activity, qualified in the form of a physical activity vital sign (PAVS) metric, has been proposed as a screening tool in primary care diagnostics. It has been suggested to correspond with BMI and chronic disease, when coupled with demographic information as well as a tool for identifying patients who do not meet certain physical activity guidelines. Generally, this metric is evaluated by a self-reported medical questionnaire, which can significantly affect the validity and applicability of a PAVS in clinical treatment determination.

A 2025 United States participation survey commissioned by the Sports & Fitness Industry Association estimated that 32 percent of Americans achieved at least 150 minutes of moderate-intensity physical activity per week. The survey separately estimated that 250 million Americans aged six or older took part in at least one sport, fitness, or leisure activity during the year.

== See also ==
- Physical inactivity
