= Sports periodization =

Systematic planning of athletic or physical training

Periodization is a cyclical method of planning and managing athletic or physical training and involves progressive cycling of various aspects of a training program during a specific period. Conditioning programs can use periodization to break up the training program into the off-season, preseason, inseason, and the postseason. Periodization divides the year round condition program into phases of training which focus on different goals.

== History ==
The roots of periodization come from Hans Selye's model, known as the General adaptation syndrome (GAS). The GAS describes three basic stages of response to stress: (a) the Alarm stage, involving the initial shock of the stimulus on the system, (b) the Resistance stage, involving the adaptation to the stimulus by the system, and (c) the Exhaustion stage, in that repairs are inadequate, and a decrease in system function results. The foundation of periodic training is keeping one's body in the resistance stage without ever going into the exhaustion stage. By adhering to cyclic training the body is given adequate time to recover from significant stress before additional training is undertaken. The goal in sports periodization is to reduce the stress at the point where the resistance stage ends so the body has time to recover. In this way the exhaustion stage does not reduce the gains achieved, the body can recover and remain above the original equilibrium point. The next cycle of increased stimulus now improves the response further and the equilibrium point continues to rise after each cycle. Banister and colleagues formalised this stress-recovery pattern for athletic performance as the fitness-fatigue model, which describes performance as the algebraic sum of a positive fitness component and a negative fatigue component, each decaying exponentially after a training stimulus.

Selye (1957) labeled beneficial stresses as "eustress" and detrimental stresses as "distress". In athletics, when physical stress is at a healthy level (eustress), an athlete experiences muscular strength and growth, while excessive physical stress (distress) can lead to tissue damage, disease, and death. Periodization is most widely used in resistance program design to avoid over-training and to systematically alternate high loads of training with decreased loading phases to improve components of muscular fitness (e.g. strength, strength-speed, and strength-endurance). The Selye-cycles are similar to the "micro cycles" used at later times.

Russian physiologist Leo Matveyev and Romanian sport scientist Tudor Bompa expanded and further organized the periodization model. Matveyev is regarded as one of the first to demonstrate a formalized model of periodization around 1964. He analysed the results of the Soviet athletes of the 1952 and 1956 summer Olympics and compared successful and not so successful athletes and their training schedules. From these training plans periodized schedules were developed for the 1960 Olympics. With the success of the Soviet athletes, Matveyev's plans were spread all over the Eastern Bloc in their annual coordination meetings. In the United States in 1979, J. Garhammer published one the first articles relating to periodization of strengthing training in athletes. Around that same time, James 'Doc' Counsilman, at the University of Indiana, talked about the periodization training that he has been using for years with swimmers.

In 1988, Grigori Goldstein, a Soviet defector shared information about periodization with American strength and conditioning coaches, including Johnny Parker. This information was published in the 2018 book The System: Soviet Periodization Adapted For the American Strength Coach.

== Theory of planning ==
Periodic training systems typically divide time up into three types of cycles: microcycle, mesocycle, and macrocycle.

=== The macrocycle ===
A macrocycle refers to a season of training in its entirety. It is an annual plan that works towards peaking for the goal competition of the year.

There are three phases in the macrocycle: preparation, competitive, and transition. The entire preparation phase should be around 2/3 to 3/4 of the macrocycle. The preparation phase is further broken up into general and specific preparation of which general preparation takes over half. An example of general preparation would be building an aerobic base for an endurance athlete such as running on a treadmill and learning any rules or regulations that would be required such as proper swimming stroke as not to be disqualified. An example of specific preparation would be to work on the proper form to be more efficient and to work more on the final format of the sport, which is to move from the treadmill to the pavement.

The competitive phase can be several competitions, but they lead up to the main competition with specific tests. Testing might include any of the following: performance level, new shoes or gear, a new race tactic might be employed, pre-race meals, ways to reduce anxiety before a race, or the length needed for the taper. When the pre-competitions are of a higher priority there is a definite taper stage while lower priority might simply be integrated in as training. The competitive phase ends with the taper and the competition.

Macrocycles are broken down into mesocycles and microcycles.

=== The mesocycle ===
A mesocycle represents a specific training block within a season, such as a strength building or endurance phase. A mesocycle can also be defined as a number of continuous weeks where the training program emphasize the same type of physical adaptations, for example muscle mass and anaerobic capacity. When periodising concurrent strength and endurance training, the sequencing of sessions within a mesocycle matters: a meta-analysis of concurrent training found that performing strength and endurance sessions too close together can interfere with both adaptations, but adequate spacing of at least six hours, or on alternate days, preserves both. During the preparatory phase, a mesocycle commonly consists of 4 – 6 micro-cycles, while during the competitive phase it will usually consist of 2 – 4 micro-cycles depending on the competition's calendar.

The goal of the plan is to fit the mesocycles into the overall plan timeline-wise to make each mesocycle end on one of the phases and then to determine the workload and type of work of each cycle based on where in the overall plan the given mesocycle falls. The goal in mind is to make sure the body peaks for the high priority competitions by improving each cycle along the way.

=== The microcycle ===
A microcycle is the smallest training set and typically lasts around a week. The main focus of a microcycle is a small focused block of training, such as two or three days of very hard training followed by the same amount of time for recovery. Each microcycle is planned based on where it is in the overall macrocycle.

A microcycle is also defined as a number of training sessions, built around a given combination of acute program variables, which include progression as well as alternating effort (heavy vs. light days). The length of the microcycle should correspond to the number of workouts - empirically often 4-16 workouts - it takes for the athlete or fitness client to adapt to the training program. When the athlete or fitness client has adapted to the program and no longer makes progress, a change to one or more program variables should be made.

== The annual plan ==
The annual plan is important in that it directs and guides performance training over a year. It is based on the concept of periodization and the principles of training. The objective of training is to reach a high level of performance (peak performance) and an athlete has to develop skills, biomotor abilities and psychological traits in a methodical manner.

=== Preparatory phase ===
This phase consists of the general preparation and specific preparation. This is a base creation phase with the objective to attain the previous training state, and the longest period of periodization must be devoted towards the preparatory period.

=== Competitive phase ===
This phase may contain a few main competitions each containing a pre-competitive and a main competition. Within the main competition, an uploading phase and a special preparatory phase may be included.

=== Transition phase ===
This phase is used to facilitate psychological rest, relaxation and biological regeneration as well as to maintain an acceptable level of general physical preparation. This phase lasts 3–4 weeks (perhaps longer) but should not exceed five weeks under normal conditions and may be sports specific. It allows the body to fully regenerate so that it is prepared for the next discipline. There are no competitions in this phase.

=== Opposition to periodization ===
A review published in the journal 'Sports Medicine' in 2017 has questioned the validity of the use of traditional models of periodization in sport. This is largely due to the oversimplified assumptions put forward in the early development of periodization theory that are not always transferable to the psycho-biological effects of various training methods used in sport.

Periodization has been questioned due to it being viewed as reductionist/deterministic. In coaching in particular it is oversimplified and doesn't take into account the true nature of coaching which is viewed as a dynamic, chaotic and forever changing environment. Periodization fails to consider the athlete, coach and the context of the coaching taking place. The improvement of an athlete or a team in sports varies depending on an individual's hormonal response, genetic predispositions, motivation, stress levels, as well as transient social and environmental variables.

Periodization is suggested to be the optimum method of sports training when aiming to enhance team performance due to the organisational and structural nature to its approach. Kiely (2012) states periodization provides benefits such as providing idealized training structures, times frames to progress athletes and therefore development and retention of overall fitness adaptations. However, within team sports, such as football, can be complicated due to the various training goals, volume of training and practices required as well as an extended season of competition – with reference to additional progressive competition matches (Gamble, 2006). This showing that periodization models can be difficult to implement in team sports due to its ever-changing nature, relating to why there are limited studies regarding the implementation of periodization in team sports.

== Tactical periodization ==
For many years, football training and its planning has been (and still is) characterised by fragmented thinking of which has perhaps been attributed to the success of such an approach in individual sports. The emphasis of planning and improvement was mainly in regards to the physical attributes of strength, speed and endurance. Furthermore, whether it be the undulating model, the reverse linear model or the traditional periodization framework, one of the underpinning assumptions is that it would be best to segregate the programme into distinct training blocks in a sequential hierarchy i.e. a training block to build endurance before speed and strength before power. This is claimed to be based on the 'science of periodization'. However, Kiely, argues that the proof on which this is all based on is flawed because the studies used to build this proof have only 'compared training interventions with no training variation to those with degrees of variation' but did not offer any insight 'into how that variation is best scheduled and organised' (Kiely, 2010, p. 4). So although it is commonly agreed that training variation is an important design feature which needs to be integrated into the training plan, there is 'little or no supporting evidence' which proves that the segregation of the program into distinct training blocks or that there should be sequential hierarchy of how this should be done is in fact advantageous.

Many authors such as Garganta, Maia, & Marque, Oliveira, Castelo, and Gaiteiro have argued in regards to the indivisibility of the 4 components which make up a football performance...technical, tactical, physical and mental. This complexity makes football a multidimensional phenomenon which cannot be simply reduced to the sum of its parts. Is defending more important than attacking or vice versa? This question cannot be answered as football needs to be understood as a whole. As highlighted by Tamarit, football is a tactical game where players are constantly required to make decisions in response to specific situations. So football needs to be viewed as a tactical game which encompasses with it the physical, technical and mental aspects required for positive performances. This is the foundation upon which Victor Frade developed a training methodology known as tactical periodisation which emphasises the development of the tactical dimension. Therefore, any physical, technical or mental development must always have a tactical intention. In other words, although the ability to run for 90 minutes may seem vital to play the game, knowing when, where and how to run is much more important.
