= Weight cycling =

Cyclical loss and gain of weight

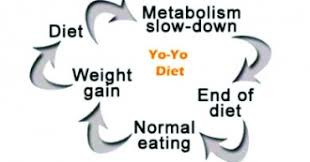
Yo-yo cycle

Weight cycling, also known as yo-yo dieting, is the repeated loss and gain of weight, resembling the up-down motion of a yo-yo. The temporary weight loss of yo-yo dieting is often caused by quick yet unsustainable success of strict diets. The dieter often gives up due to hunger or discomfort, and gains the weight back. The dieter then seeks to lose the regained weight, and the cycle begins again. Other individuals cycle weight deliberately in pursuit of bodybuilding or athletic goals. Weight cycling contributes to increased risk of later obesity, due to repeated signals being sent to the body signalling that it is in starvation mode; therefore it learns to store fat more readily, and increases the strain on vital organs, likely promoting cardiometabolic disease.

== Causes ==
=== Dieting ===
The reasons for yo-yo dieting are varied but often include embarking upon a hypocaloric diet too extreme to maintain. At first the dieter may experience elation at the thought of weight loss and pride in their self-control for resisting certain foods, e.g. junk food, desserts, and sweets. Over time, however, the limits imposed by such extreme diets cause effects such as depression or fatigue that make the diet impossible to sustain. Ultimately, the dieter reverts to their old eating habits, now with the added emotional effects of failing to lose weight by the restrictive diet. Such an emotional state leads many people to eating more than they would have before dieting, especially the 'forbidden' foods e.g. junk food, desserts, and sweets, causing them to rapidly regain weight.

=== Sports ===
In some sports where an athlete's weight is important, such as those that use weight classes or aesthetics, it is common for athletes to engage in weight cycling. Weight cycling is common among competitive combat sports athletes, including minors. In bodybuilding and strength sports, weight cycling is often used as a way to take advantage of the increased ability to gain muscle while in a caloric surplus by cyclically going through periods of intentional weight gain, followed by a period of weight loss to prevent excessive body fat accumulation.

=== Mechanism ===
The process of regaining weight and especially body fat is further promoted by the high metabolic plasticity of skeletal muscle. The Summermatter cycle explains how skeletal muscle persistently reduces energy expenditure during dieting. In addition, food restriction increases physical activity which further supports body weight loss initially. Such weight regain in the form of preferential catch-up-fat is well documented after weight loss due to malnutrition, cancer, septic shock or AIDS and thus constitutes a general phenomenon related to weight loss.

== Health effects ==
Weight cycling might have negative health effects from repeated strain on the body.

A 2019 systematic review and meta-analysis found that "Body-weight fluctuation was associated with higher mortality due to all causes and CVD and a higher morbidity of CVD and hypertension."

A 2019 review found that self-reported weight cycling was correlated with an increased risk of endometrial cancer. Weight cycling is also correlated with kidney cancer, independently of whether the person is overweight.

A 2021 systematic review and meta-analysis found that "weight cycling was a strong independent predictor of new-onset diabetes".

Weight cycling is also associated with poorer mental health.

== See also ==
- Excess post-exercise oxygen consumption (EPOC)
- Fad diet
- Healthy diet
- Peltzman effect
