= Boxercise =

High-intensity interval training based on boxing

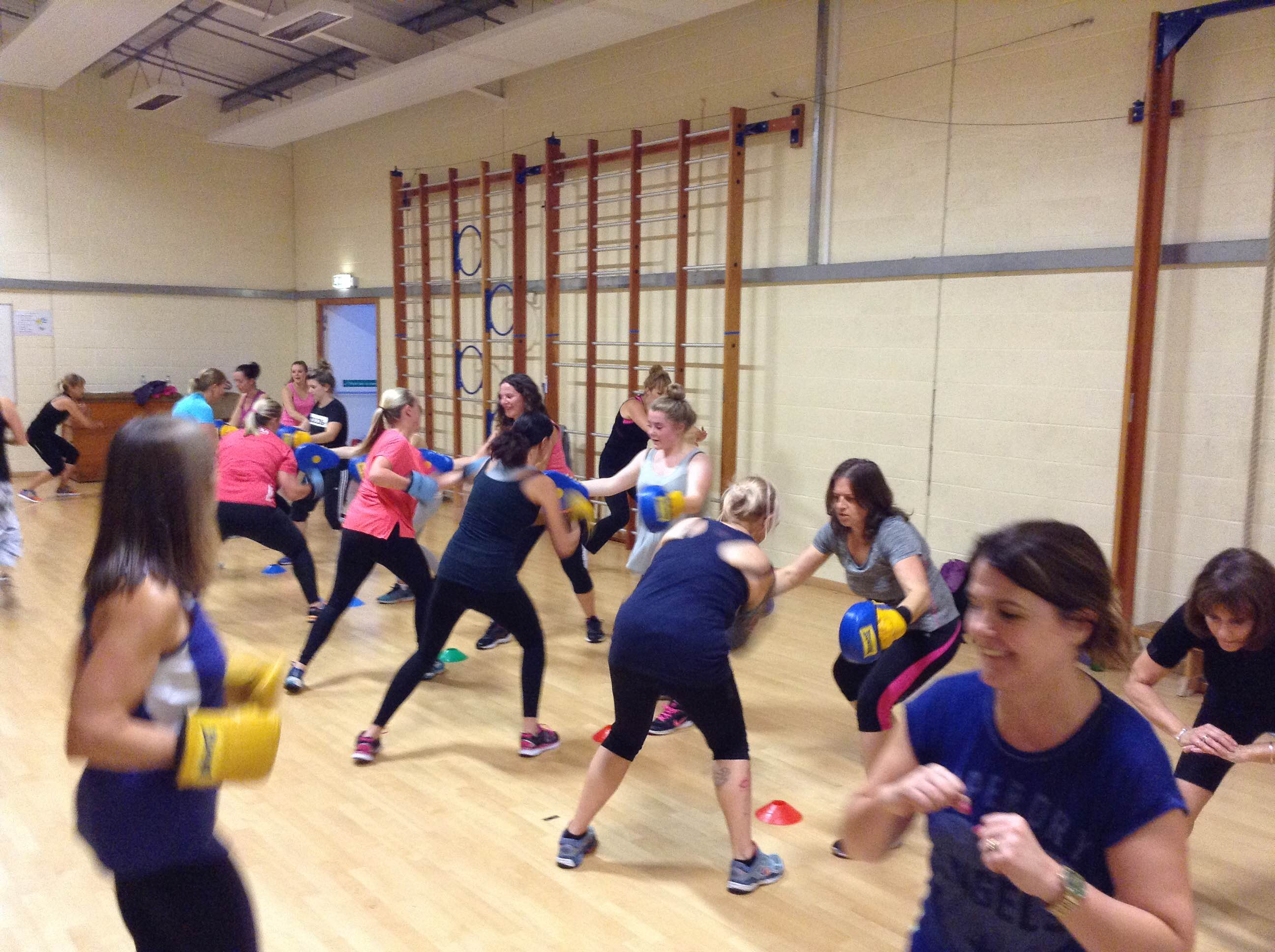

Boxercise is a high intensity interval training class based on boxing training. It differs from boxing in that boxing is a competitive sport whereas Boxercise includes aspects of boxing training but not sparring or competitive bouts.

== History ==
The concept started in the United Kingdom in 1992, created by boxing coach Andy Wake. The company he started grew in popularity through the 1990s gaining over 1.2 million participants in the UK.

The concept became popular worldwide as a generic fitness class and also with personal trainers using padwork to train their clients and fitness boot camp instructors using the techniques. Using focus pads or mitts is a popular style. The objective of the classes is typically to achieve fitness or health benefits.

Boxercise is a registered trademark. Boxercise, the company, was selected to work with Muhammad Ali Enterprises in 2011 producing a boxing training program bearing the name Muhammad Ali workout.

The classes usually involve group exercise, warm-ups and working as partners using gloves and pads to go through boxing combinations of jab, hook, cross and uppercut. There is a focus on the correct stances orthodox and southpaw.

== See also ==
- Fitness culture
- Health club
- Gym
- Tae-Bo
