= Tabata (surname) =

Tabata (written: 田畑, 田端 or 田畠) is a Japanese surname. Notable people with the surname include:

- Akihiro Tabata (田畑 昭宏, born 1978), Japanese footballer
- Bruno Tabata (born 1997), Brazilian footballer
- Hajime Tabata (田畑 端), Japanese video game director
- Izumi Tabata (田畑 泉, born 1956), Japanese academic
- Kazumi Tabata (田畑 和美, born 1943), Japanese karate grand master
- Kazuya Tabata (田畑 一也, born 1969), Japanese baseball player
- Kenji Tabata (田端 健児, born 1974), Japanese sprinter
- Maki Tabata (田畑 真紀, born 1974), Japanese speed skater and cycle racer
- Masahiro Tabata (田端 正広, born 1940), Japanese politician
- Momoha Tabata (田畑 百葉, born 2002), Japanese curler
- Nobushige Tabata (田端 信成, born 1989), Japanese footballer
- Rodrigo Tabata, Japanese-Brazilian footballer
- Seiji Tabata (田畑 政治, 1898–1984), President of the Japanese Olympic Committee
- Teruki Tabata (田畑 輝樹, born 1979), Japanese footballer
- Tomoko Tabata (田畑 智子, born 1980), Japanese actress
- Wakako Tabata (田畑 和歌子), Japanese sports sailor
- Yoshio Tabata (田端 義夫, 1919–2013), Japanese ryūkōka and enka singer, songwriter, and electric guitarist
- Yūki Tabata (田畠裕基), Japanese manga artist

== See also ==
- José Tábata, Venezuelan baseball player
