= Long slow distance =

Aerobic endurance training

Long slow distance (LSD) is a form of aerobic endurance training used in sports including running, rowing, skiing and cycling. It is also known as aerobic endurance training, base training and Zone 2 training. Physiological adaptations to LSD training include improved cardiovascular function, improved thermoregulatory function, improved mitochondrial energy production, increased oxidative capacity of skeletal muscle, and increased utilization of fat for fuel. Ernst van Aaken, a German physician and coach, is generally recognized as the founder of the LSD method of endurance training.

LSD training is a form of continuous training performed at a constant pace at low to moderate intensity over an extended distance or duration. The moderate training intensity of LSD is effective in improving endurance and maximum oxygen uptake in individuals who are undertrained or moderately trained. Although LSD training is not effective when used in isolation by well-trained athletes, there is substantial evidence that elite athletes spend 70% or more of their training time at LSD output levels, that LSD effort levels are a necessary part of the training of world class athletes, and that LSD workouts are primary drivers of the lower resting heart rates seen in well conditioned athletes.

== History ==
Tim Noakes, a professor of exercise and sports science at the University of Cape Town, suggests that it was Arthur Newton who initially proposed that running longer distances at slower paces was the most effective training method for beginning runners. Noakes asserts that after this method was rediscovered in the 1960s, Joe Henderson coined the term "long slow distance".

== Joe Henderson ==
Long slow distance running was promoted as a training method by Joe Henderson in 1969. Henderson saw his approach as providing an alternative to the dominant school of training for distance running which he called “PTA school of running – the pain, torture, and agony” approach. He documented the success of six competitive runners who followed in one form or another an LSD training regime, sometimes combining a few more strenuous workouts with the regular LSD running with weekly distances ranging from 80–100 kilometres (50–60 miles) to 190–240 kilometres (120–150 miles) per week, with marathon personal bests between 2:14 and 2:50 hours. In addition, there are ultra-marathoners who use a similar method for training. A typical 5k runner might consider 13 to 16 kilometres (8 to 10 miles) of LSD, while a marathoner might run 32 kilometres (20 miles) or more. LSD runs are typically done at an easy pace, 1–2 minutes per kilometre slower than a runner's 10k pace.

Henderson's book was not only directed at competitive runners, but also at runners who wanted to have fun running. He writes, “LSD isn't just a training method. It's a whole way of looking at the sport. Those who employ it are saying running is fun – all running, not just the competitive part which yields rewards.”

== Approaches to running ==
During the running boom of the 1970s, many recreational runners used LSD as a basis for training. One of the "fathers" of the Honolulu Marathon, cardiologist Jack Scaff used a long slow distance approach to train runners in his marathon clinics. Scaff advised his runners to follow the "talk test", an idea that had originated from Arthur Lydiard in which runners should be going slow enough to be able to hold a conversation. According to sportswriter John Brant in his 2006 book Duel in the Sun, almost every serious distance runner in the early 1980s used Lydiard's system of building an endurance base with many miles at an aerobic pace before running shorter distances at an anaerobic pace.

Starting out with an hour run, three times a week, and building up to weekly averages of 60 to 100 kilometres (40 to 60 mi) a week for the last three months, thousands of graduates of the program have found that they could complete the full Honolulu Marathon which is held every year at the beginning of December. The clinic's approach can be seen from its original Rules of the Road, now referred to as the "basic set of rules that lay the foundation for your training."

The rules:
- No fewer than three runs per week
- No more than five runs per week
- No less than one hour per run
- No farther than 15 miles (24 km) on any run
- One run per week lasting two hours or more (after month 5)

A variant of the LSD approach is to combine running slowly with walking breaks.

"It has been found that average runners will have more success if they take regular walk breaks.
"The strategy is unusual in that it doesn't involve simply walking when you are tired. Walk-break runners force themselves to stop even at the beginning of a run when they are fresh."

An example of such an approach is provided by the running clinics organized by Jeff Galloway In running circles, John Bingham aka the Penguin, is a well-known practitioner of LSD combined with walking breaks.

Another practitioner is Phil Maffetone, who created the Maffetone Method which is also called Low Heart Rate Training. His methodology involves finding the maximum heart rate for training in an easy aerobic zone and initially doing all workouts in that zone. This is similar to LSD, but gives heart rate as a concrete way to know when to slow down. This style of training may be used by people dealing with health issues, overtraining and learning how to build an aerobic base.

== Limitations ==
Arthur Lydiard wrote that LSD system of training does not reach the levels of effort most effective for building aerobic fitness. Pete Pfitzinger has written that the long slow distance method of training is acceptable for novice runners hoping to complete a marathon, but that more experienced runners benefit from long runs that, depending on the workout, incorporate a variety of paces including speeds approaching race pace. According to Pfitzinger, varying paces are necessary because different physiological adaptations, including increased glycogen storage and fat utilization, occur at specific training paces.

Galloway points out that if a runner wishes to increase their speed, interval training or speed training is recommended. Henderson uses races as speedwork and is a proponent of speedwork in limited quantities.

The scientific literature indicates that high-intensity training can provide greater benefit towards anaerobic capacity than moderate-intensity endurance training. The U.S. Army is reducing the use of long runs in its physical training programs.

== See also ==
- Continuous training
- Fartlek
- High-intensity interval training
- Interval training
- Strength training
- vVO_{2}max
