= Woldemar Gerschler =

German athletics coach

- Born: June 14, 1904; Meißen, Germany
- Died: June 28, 1982 (aged 78); Freiburg im Breisgau, Germany
- Education: German, History and Sport at Leipzig University
- Occupations: Athletics coach and theorist
- Years active: 1930–1971
- Known for: Training world-record runners as a pioneer of interval training
- Title: German national athletics coach
- Awards: Order of Merit of Baden-Württemberg, Bundesverdienstkreuz

Woldemar Gerschler (14 June 1904 – 28 June 1982) was a German athletics coach responsible for the German national middle-distance runners at the 1936, 1952, 1956 and 1960 Olympic Games. He was one of the pioneers of interval training and coached several world-record holders such as Rudolf Harbig, Gordon Pirie and Roger Moens.

== Life ==
Gerschler was born in Meißen on 14 June 1904. He obtained his Abitur in Meißen, and then studied German, History and Sport at Leipzig University under Hermann Altrock among others. After he finished his studies, he spent some years teaching at a Gymnasium before becoming a professional coach.

In Dresden, he discovered the then unknown Rudolf Harbig and became his coach. Gerschler coached Harbig to several world records (e.g. in 800 metres in 1939), consequently he was appointed the German national coach. He also coached Käthe Krauß, who competed in the 1936 Olympic Games. In spite of being the German national coach, Gerschler coached world-record holding runners of other nations such as the Englishman Gordon Pirie (3000 metres and 5000 metres) and the Belgian Roger Moens (800 metres). In this period he wrote his books on long jump and triple jump.

After the Second World War, Gerschler also worked as a football manager for FC St. Pauli in 1947/48, and Eintracht Braunschweig in 1948/49. In Braunschweig, Gerschler also coached the athletes of the club who, especially in walking, were among the best in Germany in the late 1940s and early 1950s and won many German titles. His pupil Rudi Lüttge set an unofficial world record in Braunschweig in 1948.

From 1948 onwards Gerschler also acted as Lehrwart of the Deutscher Leichtathletik Ausschuss, the predecessor of the Deutscher Leichtathletik-Verband.

On 1 December 1949, at the instigation of Herbert Reindell, Gerschler was named director of the Institut für Leibesübungen (Institute for physical exercises) at the Albert-Ludwigs-Universität Freiburg. However, as he did not have a doctorate, he was only paid as an Akademischer Oberrat (senior member of the Academic Senate). He was only made a professor shortly before his retirement in 1971. He was awarded the Order of Merit of Baden-Württemberg for his services to sport and the Bundesverdienstkreuz (Order of Merit of the Federal Republic of Germany).

Gerschler died on 28 June 1982 in Freiburg im Breisgau, Germany.

== Training methods ==
Gerschler coached Rudolf Harbig to become the world's best in his events in the 1930s using the then new methods of interval training, of which Gerschler was a pioneer. While working in Freiburg, Gerschler experimented with a system of short distance training runs, demanding of the athletes that they should run "so fast that the pace required in competition would seem moderate and achievable". Interval training as practised in Freiburg was essentially physiologically oriented, being based on heart rates. Gerschler also attached considerable importance to training during the winter, which had been previously neglected, saying that "long-distance runners should not deviate too far from the type of training they practised in summer".

== Publications ==
- Weit- und Dreisprung. (Long jump and triple jump) Limpert, Berlin 1937. (3rd edition in 1943)
- Harbigs Aufstieg zum Weltrekord. (Harbig's rise to the world record) Verlag Hermann Püschel, Dresden 1939.

== Literature ==
- "Medizinmann der Weltrekordler – Olympia-Trainer Woldemar Gerschler" [Medicine man of world-record holders – Olympic trainer Woldemar Gerschler], Der Spiegel, 14 February, Front-page story (in German), no. 47, 1956
- Arnd Krüger: Viele Wege führen nach Olympia. Die Veränderungen in den Trainingssystemen für Mittel- und Langstreckenläufer (1850–1997). (Many roads lead to Olympia. The changes in the training system for middle- and long-distance runners (1850-1997).) In: N. Gissel (ed.): Sportliche Leistung im Wandel. (Changing sporting achievements) Czwalina, Hamburg 1998, S. 41–56.
