= Margaria–Kalamen power test =

Fitness test

The Margaria–Kalamen power test, or Margaria–Kalamen stair climb is a short exercise intended to measure an athlete's lower body peak power by having the athlete run up stairs.

== Purpose ==
The Margaria–Kalamen test is an assessment that monitors athlete’s strength and power of lower extremities and helps coaches to see if the athlete’s training program is effective. This test was introduced by J Kalamen (1968) and is a variation of the original Margaria step test developed by Rudolfo Margaria (1966).

The test is of very short duration, lasting less than five seconds, so is both anaerobic and alactic. The Margaria–Kalamen test has been a standard test for determining peak power for some time, and at one time was thought to be a measure of the power of the pure alactic anaerobic system. However, it is now thought that even on such a short test, there is still a significant contribution from the lactic anaerobic system.

== Procedure ==
The test is conducted by having the athlete run up a flight of at least nine steps. Each step is around 17.8 cm (7 inches) tall, but it does not have to be exact, the height is taken into account in the calculation of power. The athlete starts six metres from the bottom of the steps and then runs up them three at a time, stepping on the third, sixth and ninth steps. The interval between the athlete placing a foot on the third and ninth step is timed. This time interval is very small (of the order of one second), and it is difficult to get accurate results with a stopwatch. Because of this, in a professional setting, it is usual to place pressure mats on the third and ninth steps and use these to respectively start and stop an electronic timer.

The power, P, exerted by the athlete is calculated by,

$$P = {m g h \over t}$$
where,
m is the mass of the athlete
h is the vertical height between the third and ninth steps
t is the time between stepping on the third and ninth steps
g is acceleration due to gravity, approximately 9.81 m/s^{2}

To obtain power in units of watts, that is, SI units, the mass must be expressed in kilograms and the time in seconds.

American football coaches use a slight variation of this test. In the football stair climb test the athlete runs up twenty steps four at a time.
