= Summermatter cycle =

Physiological concept

The Summermatter cycle is a physiological concept describing the complex relationship between physical activity/inactivity and energy expenditure/conservation.

The concept provides an evidence-based explanation why dieting fails in most cases and results in a Yo-yo effect. A central element of the Summermatter cycle is that reductions in energy intake, occurring with dieting or starvation, initially successfully induce weight and adipose tissue loss. At the same time, the reduced food availability prompts ambulatory activity, which further accelerates body and fat mass loss and depletes ATP, glycogen and intramyocellular lipids (IMCL) in skeletal muscle. The scarcity of energy ultimately suppresses thermogenesis in skeletal muscle to conserve energy.

As soon as energy becomes available again, this originally adaptive, thrifty program supports the replenishment of energy stores and weight regain. Fat deposition is the most efficient way for the body to store energy. This phenomenon of energy store replenishment is driven by a hyperinsulinemic state and is referred to as preferential catch-up fat. Satiety signals during the period of food availability automatically lead to rest, which further supports adipose tissue regain and the restoration of glycogen and IMCL pools in muscle. As a result, the majority of people rapidly regain body weight. Exercise increases energy expenditure and can counteract the suppression of thermogenesis in skeletal muscle thereby preventing weight regain. In addition, regular exercise promotes the turnover of ATP, glycogen and IMCLs.

The hypothesis was put forward in 2012 and Benton, et al. named the cycle in 2017 after its inventor, the Swiss biochemist, nutritionist and exercise physiologist Dr. Serge Summermatter.

The concept of the Summermatter cycle finds broad application in body weight management to time exercise interventions and avoid catch-up fat (yo-yo effect). The recent advances in the treatment of obesity (e.g., GLP-1 and GIP agonists like Ozempic, Wegovy etc.) has further spurred interest in the Summermatter cycle. Treatments with incretins like semaglutide induce not only fat but also muscle mass loss. The suppressed thermogenesis described by the Summermatter cycle explains the weight and fat regain in patients that discontinue incretins. Moreover, the concept is used by elite athletes to optimally coordinate their training bouts and energy intake.
