= Izumi Tabata =

Japanese scientist

Izumi (Joseph) Tabata
- 田畑泉
- Born: 1956
- Occupations: Dean at Ritsumeikan University Graduate School of Sport and Health Science
- Known for: Exercise science
- Website: http://www.ritsumei.ac.jp/rs/category/tokushu/150715/#content01

Izumi (Joseph) Tabata (田畑 泉, Tabata Izumi) is dean of the Ritsumeikan University Graduate School of Sport and Health Science. His name became famous in relation to the "Tabata Protocol", one form of high-intensity interval training, although Tabata credits Olympic speed skating coach Koichi Irisawa with pioneering the technique.

Tabata was educated in Japan and Norway, and studied for a year at Washington University in St. Louis. Prior to his tenure at Ritsumeikan University, he worked at the National Institute for Health and Nutrition in Japan, and with the Japanese speed skating team.

Tabata has contributed to many highly cited articles, and in 2020 had an h-index of 41, according to Clarivate Analytics. The most cited article has been cited over 900 times, according to Google Scholar. Dr. Tabata has authored or co-authored over 100 additional scholarly articles in publications such as Journal of Applied Physiology, Japanese Journal of Physical Fitness and Sports Medicine, Environmental Health and Preventive Medicine, European Journal of Clinical Nutrition, and European Journal of Applied Physiology.

== Commercial involvement ==
From February 2013 to December 2016, Universal Pictures and Tabata jointly licensed a high-intensity exercise program trademarked as Tabata, based around 20 seconds of intense exercise and 10 seconds of rest.
