= Preflexes =

Latent capacities in the musculoskeletal system

Preflexes are the latent capacities in the musculoskeletal system that auto-stabilize movements through the use of the nonlinear visco-elastic properties of muscles when they contract. The term "preflex" for such a zero-delay, intrinsic feedback loop was coined by Loeb. Unlike stabilization methods using neurons, such as reflexes and higher brain control, a preflex happens with minimal time delay; however, it only stabilizes the main movements of the musculoskeletal system.

== Visco-elastic correction ==
Muscles possess nonlinear visco-elastic properties when they contract. This property can autocorrect movements when a muscle is forced to change its length, and at a velocity different from that with which it was originally commanded. Such automatic correction is useful when a commanded action is perturbated, for example, if a step goes into a hole as this causes the foot to unexpectedly stretch down. The nonlinear visco-elastic properties of muscles interact with these perturbation induced velocity and length differences such that they counteract directly, as they happen, the effects upon the body of the perturbation. Part of the resistance to perturbation is passive, by means of the nonlinear increase in passive tension and joint torques produced by muscular and other soft tissues. Tissue prestress is a preflexive property that constitutes a basal level of passive tension which, due to its presence in antagonistic tissues of a joint, increases joint passive stiffness and stability.

== Evolutionary opportunity ==
Muscles contain many different systems on which the evolutionary selection of preflex stabilization can operate. The deltoid muscle, for example, consists of at least seven segments with different bone attachments and neural control. Within each muscle segment, there exists a complex internal structure that goes down to one in which each muscle unit consists of a tendon, aponeurosis, and a fascicle of active contractile and passive elements. Another source of variation is in the internal architecture of the fiber orientation relative to a muscle's line of action, for example, as found in pennate muscles. The complexities of the different visco-elastic length- and velocity-force relationships of these subparts provides the opportunity for the adaptive selection of structurally complex muscle biocomposites with highly task-tuned nonlinear visco-elastic length- velocity- force relationships. This nature of muscles to be composite structures thus provides the adaptive opportunity for evolution to modify the visco-elastic reactions of the musculoskeletal system so they counteract perturbations without the need for spinal or higher levels of control.

== Examples ==
=== Leg step recovery ===
Helmeted guineafowl like many other bipedal birds walk upon rough ground. When a guineafowl's leg steps into a hole (a common disruption against which evolution has tuned the nonlinear visco-elastic properties of its musculoskeletal system), a momentarily uncommanded velocity and length change in the muscles that span its leg joints occurs. This length/velocity discrepancy interacts with the nonlinear length and velocity-force relationships that have evolved in response to such a disruption with the result that the leg extends further into the hole, and thus keeps the bird's body stable and upright.

=== Leg wiping ===
It is the intrinsic musculoskeletal properties of a frog's leg, not neurally mediated spinal reflexes, that stabilize its wiping movements at irritants when the leg movement is instigated.

=== Squat jumps ===
A human example of a preflex stabilization occurs when a person explosively jumps up from a squat position, and the leg muscles act to provide a minimal time delay against perturbations from the vertical.
