= Continuous training =

Exercise

Continuous Training is a form of exercise that is performed at a continuous intensity throughout and doesn't involve any rest periods. Continuous training typically involves aerobic activities such as running, cycling, swimming, and rowing. Continuous training can be performed at low, moderate, or high exercise intensities, and is often contrasted with interval training, often called high-intensity interval training. Some training regimens, such as Fartlek, combine both continuous and interval approaches.

Exercise modes noted as suitable for continuous training include indoor and outdoor cycling, jogging, running, walking, rowing, stair climbing, simulated climbing, Nordic skiing, elliptical training, aerobic riding, aerobic dancing, bench step aerobics, hiking, in-line skating, rope skipping, swimming, and water aerobics.

== Exercise intensities ==
As the below examples illustrate, exercise intensity is measured in different ways and is defined inconsistently across studies. Forms of continuous exercise may be performed at multiple intensities for different health benefits; for example, long slow distance training can be performed at low or moderate intensities.

=== Low-intensity ===
Examples of low-intensity continuous exercise protocols include:

- 30% of peak power output for 60 minutes (cycling and football).

=== Moderate-intensity ===
Definitions of moderate intensity continuous exercise include:

- 70-75% maximum heart rate for 50 minutes.
- 60-65% VO_{2}max for 30 minutes.
- 65% of peak power output for 40 minutes.

=== High-intensity ===
Examples of high-intensity continuous training protocols include:

- 100% of peak power output until exhaustion (cycling).
- 80% of peak power output for 45 minutes (cycling).
