= Tudor Bompa =

American academic

Personal information
- Born: Tudor Olimpius Bompa; 23 December 1932 (age 93) Năsăud, Romania
- Education: State University of New York at Buffalo; Vrije Universiteit Brussel
- Occupation: Professor
- Spouse: Tamara Bompa

Sport
- Country: Kingdom of Romania
- Sport: Rowing
Medal record
Men's rowing
Representing Romania
European Rowing Championships
Silver medal – second place	1958 Poznań	Coxed four

Tudor Olimpius Bompa is a sports scientist. He is a Professor Emeritus at York University in Toronto, Ontario, Canada. He is married to Tamara Bompa, who is an associate lecturer at York University.

== Background ==
Tudor Olimpius Bompa was born on 23 December 1932, in the town of Năsăud, in Bistrița-Năsăud County, Romania. He attended his first school classes in his hometown, and in 1949 he moved to the Sports School in Cluj-Napoca. During his junior years, he was part of the national athletics team, and won several silver and bronze medals at the National Championships, in the pentathlon, javelin and discus competitions.

In his teens, Bompa played competitive soccer and competed in sprint and pentathlon. After an ankle injury, he swapped to rowing, which he found difficult as it is an endurance sport rather than a strength sport that he had been used to through his track and field career. At the 1958 European Rowing Championships, he won a silver medal in the coxed four event.

He attended the courses of the Institute of Physical Culture and Sports, a prestigious sports academy in the Romanian capital city, Bucharest, which he graduated at the age of 24, in 1956. Between 1956 and 1970, he served as Director of the Central Army House Sports Club, as an assistant professor at the Polytechnic Institute of Timișoara and the University of Bucharest, and as Athletic Director at Politehnica Timișoara Sports Club. Starting in 1960, he laid the foundations of new training methods for performance athletes, which were first published in the journal "Studies and Research" Politehnica University of Timișoara.

In 1970 Bompa emigrated to Canada, where he attended Masters studies at York University, in Toronto, between 1972 and 1974. In 1975 enrolled in the doctoral studies program at State University of New York at Buffalo, graduating with a Ph.D. degree in 1979 with thesis "Mechanical analysis of the action of the arms". He was also conferred a Ph.D. degree by the Free University of Brussels, in Belgium.

== Honors ==
Bompa has received 23 honors in 21 countries, including Life-Long Achievements Awards, NSCA, in Las Vegas, 2014. He has also received the title of Doctor Honoris Causa, Politehnica University of Timișoara, 2017. His most prominent book, Periodization:Theory and Methodology of Training has been voted Year Book, 2018, a best seller, and Best Sports Science Book of 2018.

=== Books ===
Bompa has published 19 books; some of them have been translated into 22 languages, and have sold over one million copies.

1. The Cyclist's Training Bible — published 1996 — 13 editions
2. Periodization Training for Sports — published 1999 — 8 editions
3. Periodization: Theory and Methodology of Training — published 1994 — 6 editions
4. Serious Strength Training – published 1998 — 7 editions
5. Total Training for Young Champions – published 1999 — 2 editions
6. Periodization in Rugby – published 2008 — 4 editions
7. Theory And Methodology Of Training: The Key To Athletic Performance – published 1983 — 3 editions
8. Periodization Of Strength: The New Wave In Strength Training
9. Conditioning Young Athletes – published 2015 — 2 editions
10. Power Training for Sport: Plyometrics for Maximum Power Development – published 1994 — 3 editions
11. Total Hockey Conditioning: From Pee Wee To Pro – published 1999 — 3 editions
12. Fitness And Body Development Exercises
13. 週期化運動訓練
14. Musculacion. Entrenamiento avanzado
15. Total Training For Coaching Team Sports: A Self Help Guide
16. Periodización del entrenamiento deportivo (Deportes nº 24)
17. From Childhood to Champion Athlete – published 1995
