= Supercompensation =

Post-training period of high performance

Heterochronism of supercompensation: Different parameters require different amounts of time to recover after strain. Tendons and bone tissue require considerably longer to adapt than muscle tissue.

In sports science theory, supercompensation refers to the post-training period during which the trained parameter has a higher performance capacity than it did prior to the training period.

== Description ==
The adaptation of the load is called supercompensation.

Initial fitness, training, recovery, and supercompensation

First put forth by Russian scientist Nikolai N. Yakovlev in 1949–1959, this theory is a basic principle of athletic training. The fitness level of a human body in training can be broken down into four periods: initial fitness, training, recovery, and supercompensation. During the initial fitness period, the target of the training has a base level of fitness. Upon entering the training period, the target's level of fitness decreases. After the training period, the body enters the recovery period, during which the level of fitness increases back to the initial fitness level.

Because the human body is an adaptable organism, it will feel the need to adapt itself to a higher level of fitness in anticipation of the next training session. Accordingly, the increase in fitness following a training session does not stop at the initial fitness level. Instead, the body enters a period of supercompensation during which fitness surpasses the initial fitness level. If there are no further workouts, this fitness level will slowly decline back towards the initial fitness level (shown by the last time sector in the graph).

If the next workout takes place during the recovery period, overtraining may occur. If the next workout takes place during the supercompensation period, the body will advance to a higher level of fitness. If the next workout takes place after the supercompensation period, the body will remain at its base level.

Sometimes a few workouts are intentionally made in the recovery period to try to achieve greater supercompensation effects.

== Supercompensation–training programs relation ==
This process is based on various physiological functions and parameters, each of these functions and parameters have distinct recovery times and timeframes to reach supercompensation, and intervals between the peak and return to baseline fitness.

Although this process is postulated as a model for recovery, some of its parameters are not fully understood from a fundamental perspective.

Muscle Proprioception, Individual Muscle Fatigue, Intensity, Metabolism;

These are some of the complex variables that come into the equation when assessing for potential 'supercompensation' measurements.

Other influences are muscle strength and mass. For instance, muscle mass is influenced by the quantity of glycogen in the muscles, among others.

== Uses ==
In classical sport science, the yearly (sometimes multi-yearly) period is divided into micro and macro cycles, where each microcycle is responsible for the development of a specific (sometimes several) basic training function and parameter, whereas macrocycles are responsible for the development of complex parameters/functions (such as muscle strength).
