= High-intensity interval training =

Exercise strategy

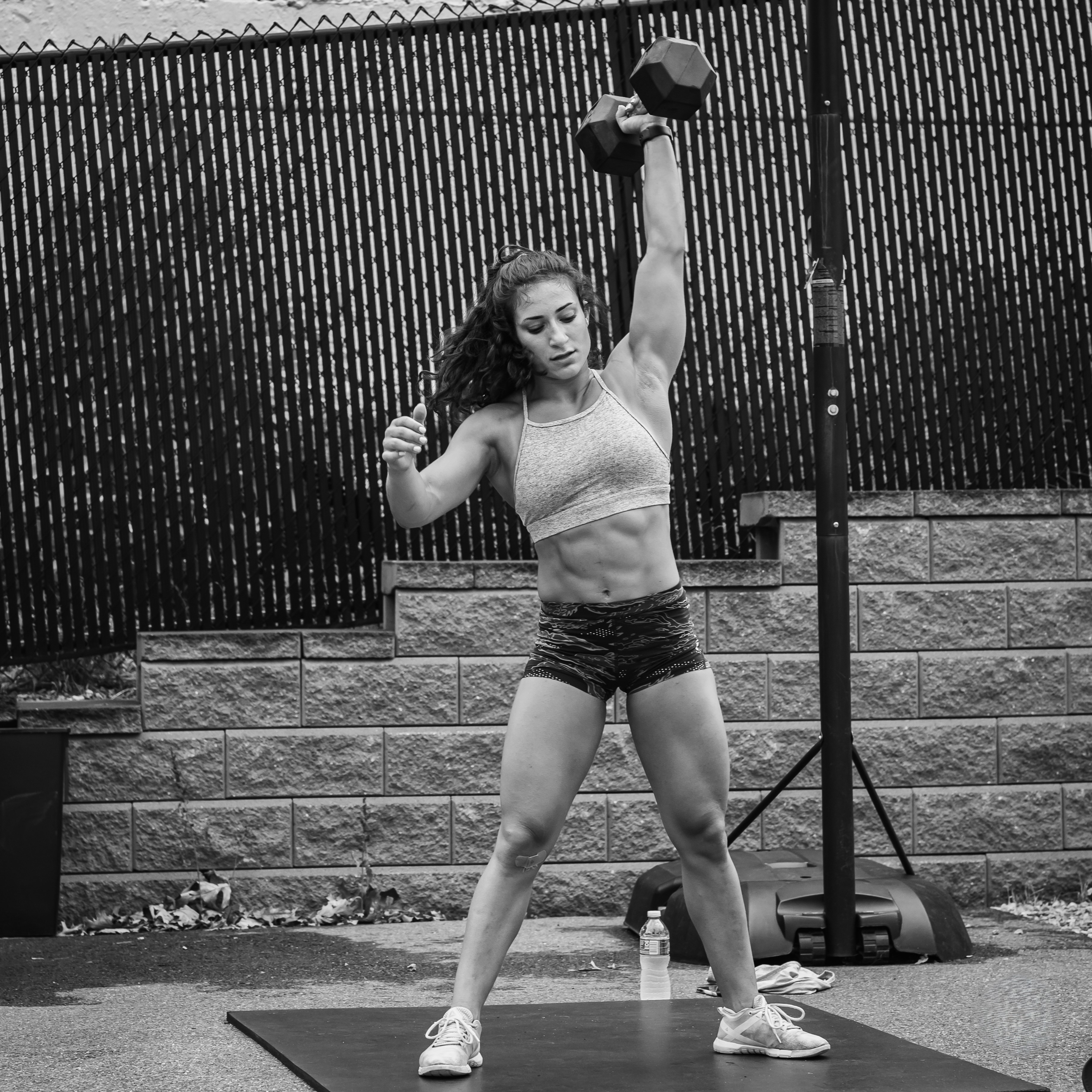
HIIT with dumbbells

High-intensity interval training (HIIT) is a training protocol alternating short periods of intense or explosive anaerobic exercise with brief recovery periods until the point of exhaustion. HIIT involves exercises performed in repeated quick bursts at maximum or near maximal effort with periods of rest or low activity between bouts. The very high level of intensity, the interval duration, and number of bouts distinguish it from aerobic (cardiovascular) activity, because the body significantly recruits anaerobic energy systems (although not completely to the exclusion of aerobic pathways). The method thereby relies on "the anaerobic energy releasing system almost maximally".

Although there are varying forms of HIIT-style workouts which may involve exercises associated with both cardiovascular activity and also resistance training, HIIT's crucial features of maximal effort, duration, and short rest periods (thereby triggering the anaerobic pathways of energy production) materially differentiate it from being considered a form of cardiovascular exercise. Though there is no universal HIIT session duration, a HIIT workout typically lasts under 30 minutes in total as it uses the anaerobic energy systems which are typically used for short, sharp bursts. The times vary, based on a participant's current fitness level. Traditional HIIT initially had been designed to be no longer than 20 seconds on with no more than 10 seconds off; however, intervals of exercise effort tend to range from 20 to 45 seconds but no longer than 75 seconds, at which point the aerobic system would then kick in.

HIIT workouts provide improved athletic capacity and condition as well as improved glucose metabolism. Compared with longer sessions typical of other regimens, HIIT may not be as effective for treating hyperlipidemia and obesity, or improving muscle and bone mass. However, research has shown that HIIT regimens produced reductions in the fat mass of the whole-body in young women comparable to prolonged moderate-intensity continuous training (MICT). Some researchers also note that HIIT requires "an extremely high level of subject motivation" and question whether the general population could safely or practically tolerate the extreme nature of the exercise regimen.

Sprint interval training (SIT) is an exercise conducted in a similar way to HIIT, but instead of using "near maximal" effort for the high-intensity periods, "supramaximal" or "all-out" efforts are used in shorter bursts. In physiological terms, "near maximal" means reaching 80–100% HR_{max}, while "supramaximal" means a pace that exceeds what would elicit VO_{2} peak. SIT regimens generally include a lower volume of total exercise compared with HIIT ones as well as longer, lower activity recovery periods and creates a greater homeostatic disturbance. Both HIIT and SIT fall into the larger class of interval training. Distinction between the two is not always maintained, even in academia: for example, Tabata describes his 170% VO_{2} max regimen as "supermaximal", but does not use the term SIT.

== Procedure ==
HIIT exercise sessions generally consist of a warm-up period followed by repetitions of high-intensity exercises separated by medium intensity exercises for recovery, then a cool-down period. The high-intensity exercise should be done at near maximum intensity. The medium exercise should be about 50% intensity. The number of repetitions and length of each depends on the exercise, but may be as little as three repetitions with just 20 seconds of intense exercise. The specific exercises performed during the high-intensity portions vary. Most of the research on HIIT has been done using a cycling ergometer, but other exercises like a rowing ergometer, running, stair climbing and uphill walking can also be effective.

There is no specific formula for HIIT. Depending on one's level of cardiovascular development, the moderate-level intensity can be as slow as walking. A typical HIIT session uses a 2:1 work-to-rest ratio, for example, 30–40 seconds of hard sprinting alternated with 15–20 seconds of jogging or walking, repeated to failure.

The entire HIIT session may last between four and 30 minutes, meaning that it is considered to be an excellent way to maximize a workout limited by time constraints. Use of a clock or timer is recommended to keep accurate times, the number of rounds, and intensity.

An alternative form of HIIT, designed for heart rate training, involves a 30-minute period of cardio followed by 30 minutes of full-body resistance training to help maximize calorie burning. The idea is to combine aerobic exercise with intense weight and resistance training to achieve a high level heart rate for an extended period of time, in order to maximize strength and endurance.

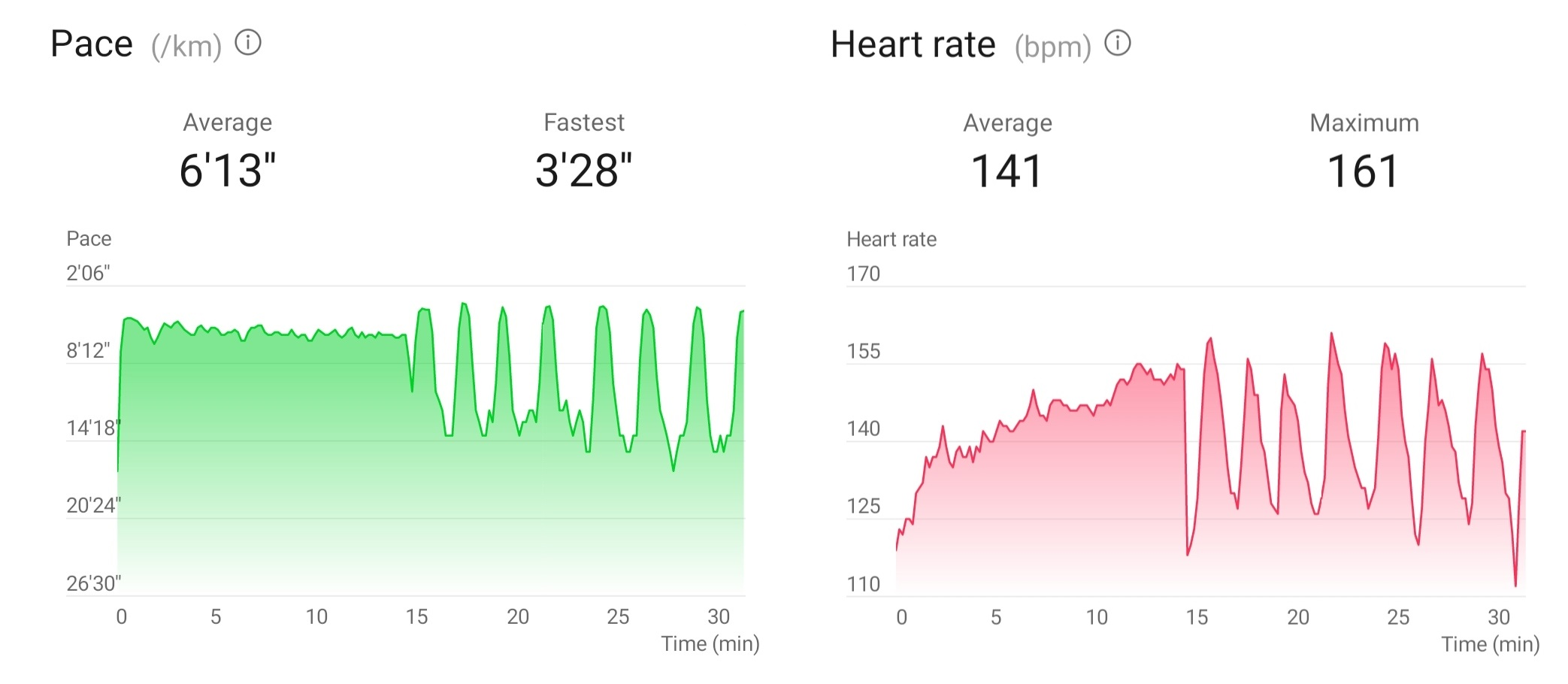
Pace and Heart rate graphs during HIIT exercise

== Branches ==
=== Peter Coe regimen ===
In the 1970s a type of high-intensity interval training with short recovery periods was used by the athletics coach Peter Coe when setting sessions for his son Sebastian Coe. Inspired by the principles propounded by the German coach and university professor Woldemar Gerschler and the Swedish physiologist Per-Olof Åstrand, Coe set sessions involving repeated fast 200 meter runs with only 30 seconds recovery between each fast run.

=== Tabata regimen ===
A version of HIIT is based on a 1996 study by Ritsumeikan University Professor Izumi Tabata (田畑泉) et al. initially involving Olympic speedskaters. The study used 20 seconds of ultra-intense exercise (at an intensity of about 170% of VO_{2}max) followed by 10 seconds of rest, repeated continuously for 4 minutes (8 cycles). The exercise was performed on a mechanically braked cycle ergometer. Tabata called this the IE1 protocol. In the original study, athletes using this method trained 4 times per week, plus another day of steady-state training, for 6 weeks and obtained gains similar to a group of athletes who did steady state training (70% VO_{2}max) 5 times per week. The steady state group had a higher VO_{2}max at the end (from 52 to 57 mL/(kg•min)). The Tabata group had achieved comparable aerobic improvements but only exercised 4 minutes per day on their 4 HIIT days compared to 60 minutes for the aerobic group. The Tabata group also started lower and gained more overall (from 48 to 55 mL/(kg•min)). Also, only the Tabata group had gained anaerobic capacity benefits (As Tabata's protocol is "supermaximal", his regimen technically falls into the scope of SIT).

=== Gibala regimen ===
Professor Martin Gibala and his team at McMaster University in Canada have been researching high-intensity exercise for several years. Their 2010 study on students uses 3 minutes for warming up, then 60 seconds of intense exercise (at 95% of VO_{2}max) followed by 75 seconds of rest, repeated for 8–12 cycles (sometimes referred to as "The Little Method"). Subjects using this method training 3 times per week on a stationary bicycle obtained gains similar to what would be expected from subjects who did steady-state (50–70% VO_{2}max) training five times per week.

Gibala's group published a less intense version of their regimen in a 2011 paper in Medicine & Science in Sports & Exercise. This was intended as a gentler option for sedentary people who had done no exercise for over a year. It included 3 minutes of warm-up, 10 repetitions of 60-second bursts at 60% peak power (80–95% of heart rate reserve) each followed by 60 seconds of recovery, and then a 5-minute cool-down.

=== Zuniga regimen ===
In 2011 Jorge Zuniga, assistant professor of exercise science at Creighton University, set out to determine how to fit the highest volume of work and oxygen consumption into the smallest amount of time. He found that intervals of 30 seconds at 90% of power output at VO_{2} max followed by 30 seconds of rest allowed for the highest VO_{2} consumption and the longest workout duration at specified intensity. Alternative protocols considered included 100% of maximum power output on the same interval schedule, similar to the Coe regimen, and 90% of maximum power output for three minutes, similar to traditional interval training.

Zuniga's protocol has been implemented with great success by students of his who were participating in Creighton's Army ROTC program. Cadets completing the protocol twice a week saw greater improvements in APFT scores than in years past. Zuniga's protocol typically consists of 10 repetitions.

=== Vollaard regimen ===
Dr Niels Vollaard at the University of Stirling proposed that when high-intensity intervals are done at "all-out" intensities, associated health benefits plateau after performing 2 or 3 sprint repetitions. This led to the development of a 10-minute exercise routine consisting of easy pedalling interspersed with two 20-second "all-out" cycling sprints. In a 2017 meta-analysis, Vollaard indeed showed that common protocols with as many as 6 to 10 repetitions of 30-second "all-out" sprints do not improve aerobic fitness more than the "2×20-s" protocol. He shifted the terminology for his to SIT. It is claimed that this short protocol may remove many of the drawbacks that make other high-intensity interval training protocols unsuitable for the general population.

In a BBC Horizon program in February 2012, Jamie Timmons, professor of systems biology at the University of Loughborough, led Michael Mosley through this exercise bike regimen, each time using three sprints instead of two. This protocol was performed three times a week for a total of 30 minutes of exercise per week (3 minutes of intense exercise), plus warm-up and recovery time.

== Regimen comparison ==
A study compared HIIT of eight 1-minute bouts at 85% maximum Watts (Wmax) interspersed with 1-minute active recovery at 25% Wmax, to SIT of eight 30-second bouts at 130% Wmax interspersed with 90-second active recovery at 25% Wmax (Total time-matched at 24 minutes including warm-up & cooldown). Its conclusion was "HIIT is the recommended routine" but "the magnitude of differences in various parameters between regimens was small; therefore, preference for either modality may be up to the individual".

== Health effects ==
=== Cardiovascular effects ===
HIIT training and traditional endurance training both lead to significantly improved cardiovascular fitness in healthy adults ages 18–45 but HIIT leads to greater improvements in VO_{2} max. In a 2013 study, HIIT was shown to increase the effectiveness of the heart to deliver oxygen to skeletal muscles and brain tissue while also improving blood flow to tissues and organs. HIIT regimens of one month or longer effectively improve cardiovascular fitness in adolescents and lead to moderate improvements in body composition. Notably, prolonged HIIT programs are similarly effective to short term low volume ones. HIIT (when defined as four intervals of four minutes at 85–95% of max heart rate with three-minute intervals at 60–70% of max heart rate) is also more effective than moderate-intensity continuous training at improving blood vessel function and markers of blood vessel health.

Comparing HIIT to moderate intensity continuous training (MICT) in people with coronary artery disease, HIIT leads to greater improvements in VO_{2} max but MICT leads to greater reductions in body weight and heart rate. Improvement to cardiorespiratory fitness, as measured by VO_{2} max, of individuals with lifestyle-induced chronic cardiovascular or metabolic diseases (including high blood pressure, obesity, heart failure, coronary artery disease, or metabolic syndrome) who completed a HIIT exercise program can be nearly double that of individuals who completed a MICT exercise program (19.4% increase and 10.3% increase, respectively).

=== Rehabilitative effects ===
For people suffering from coronary artery disease, heart failure or myocardial infarction survivors, a HIIT regimen is beneficial for substantially improving VO_{2} max and overall exercise capacity; with more intense HIIT leading to the greatest cardiovascular improvements. A combination of a proper HIIT program with active recovery instead of passive recovery is most beneficial to improving heart contractibility in people with heart failure.

=== Metabolic effects ===
HIIT significantly lowers insulin resistance compared to continuous training or control conditions and leads to modestly decreased fasting blood glucose levels and increased weight loss compared to those who do not undergo a physical activity intervention. HIIT can also improve metabolism by accelerating the removal of metabolic waste products through capillary exchange. The aerobic exercise conducted during a HIIT workout increases the number of capillaries surrounding each muscle fiber by 20–30%, thus improving capillary exchange; the exchange of gases and nutrients between blood and muscle.

=== Fat oxidation ===
HIIT can result in modest reductions of subcutaneous fat in young and healthy individuals, but greater reductions for overweight individuals. HIIT, particularly running, is a time-efficient strategy in decreasing abdominal and visceral fat-mass deposits.

A 2021 systematic review examined the effects of HIIT combined with resistance training in teens (ages 10–19), without providing a nutritional plan. The study found that 8 to 12 weeks of HIIT combined with resistance training can substantially reduce waist size and body fat percentage. However the study did not find conclusive evidence of HIIT and resistance training being an effective solitary treatment for type 2 diabetes or arterial hypertension, but did find HIIT has the potential to reduce future cardiovascular problems in teens.

=== Cognitive effects ===
HIIT can elicit short term cognitive improvements similar to those usually observed with aerobic exercise.

=== Youth ===
HIIT has been shown to increase muscle mass in adolescent populations, especially in the mid-to-late teenage years. In cases of pediatric obesity, HIIT training can be used as both a treatment and a preventative measure, as it can help decrease BMI (body mass index), decrease body fat mass percentage, decrease insulin resistance, and decrease the count of low-density lipoproteins across the body. The reduction in fat mass and BMI at a young age create effects against obesity that are also tantamount in preventing other health issues such as diabetes, coronary heart disease, and cancer. It has been shown to increase full body strength, and thereby improve full-body movement capability, which can reduce sedentariness.

== Dangers ==
The American College of Sports Medicine suggests consulting one's doctor before starting a HIIT regimen, particularly if there is a history of coronary heart disease. This is to ascertain its safety and allow the patient to build up the intensity of exercise without causing harm. It is advised to start a lower intensity and go at one's own pace.

High-intensity exercise has the potential to elicit rapid increases in systemic blood pressure that may be transmitted to the brain, which could lead to hyper-perfusion injury in at-risk populations such as sedentary adults.

There is a risk of injury due to fatigue and overtraining, so it is advised to allow time for recovery. Research from Rutgers University demonstrated that the knees, shoulders, and ankles were the most commonly involved injuries. More specifically, knee and ankle sprains were very common. Based on that, neuromuscular training and pre-strengthening programs are recommended to improve flexibility, particularly before exercise.

=== Acute stress ===
Short-term stress is also a risk factor of HIIT, causing an increase in cortisol and fight-or-flight response. This can cause an increased resting heart rate, induce feelings of depression or anxiety, and cause soreness or pain. These effects may reduce sleep quality or interfere with recovery. By reducing the intensity of the workout and maintaining proper sleep, diet, and hydration, symptoms of acute stress should be relieved within several days to weeks.

=== Advanced stress ===
Advanced stress is a more long-term form of stress in which the sympathetic nervous system is so overworked it could take weeks to months to relieve. Symptoms include a decrease in testosterone, thyroid function, bone density, overall strength, sleep quality, and occasionally neurological damage. Any evidence of these signs should indicate a temporary termination in HIIT workouts or much lower intensity of workouts until symptoms are resolved.

== Research ==
A 2007 study examined HIIT's physiological effects on fat oxidation in moderately active women. The participants in the study performed HIIT (defined as ten sets of 4-minute cycling bursts at an intensity of 90% VO2max separated by 2 minutes of rest) every other day over a 2-week period. The study found that seven sessions of HIIT over a 2-week period improved whole body fat oxidation and the capacity for skeletal muscle to oxidize fat in moderately active women.

A 2008 research study found that HIIT was more effective than moderate-intensity continuous training at lowering fasting insulin levels (31% decrease and 9% decrease, respectively).

A 2011 study compared 3 different HIIT training programs, 4×4 min, 4×8 min, and 4×16 min. The workouts were performed twice per week, at an average of 94%, 90% and 88% of the maximum heart rate, respectively. The 4×8 min regimen (4 times 8 minutes of intense work separated by 2 minutes of recovery time) was found to provide the greatest improvements in VO_{2} max (~11% after 7 weeks).

A 2017 study examined the effect of HIIT on cognitive performance among a group of children. The authors show that HIIT is beneficial to cognitive control and working memory capacity when compared against "a blend of board games, computer games, and trivia quizzes" and that this effect is mediated by the BDNF polymorphism. They conclude that the study "suggests a promising alternative to enhance cognition, via short and potent exercise regimens".

A 2019 clinical trial assessed the effects of HIIT on vascular health in inactive people and found that HIIT has beneficial vascular effects, based on observed decreases in arterial wall thickness and increase in endothelial function. The trial also found that HIIT had stronger effects than medium intensity continuous training (MICT) in enhancing flow mediated dilation and lowering pulse wave velocity in inactive adults from the greater blood flow and vasodilation of blood vessels stimulated by HIIT. Increased flow mediated dilation allows for greater opening of an artery and increased blood flow, allowing for more oxygen to be supplied throughout the body during activity. Pulse wave velocity is used to monitor arterial stiffness; which increases with age and high blood pressure, leading to a higher probability of cardiovascular problems including hypertension or a stroke.

A 2019 study on the relevance of exercise intensity in lower back rehabilitation, demonstrated higher intensity had a greater effectiveness with back therapy than moderate intensity exercise. Participants in the HIIT group had a decrease in back pain intensity and an increase in back muscle strength. In 2020, a similar study explained the strong effectiveness of cardiorespiratory HIIT in treating lower back pain, when combined with other forms of HIIT or mobility exercises.

A 2020 study examined the impact of HIIT and moderate intensity continuous training (MICT) on overweight individuals by measuring the effect on cardiorespiratory fitness (CRF). The study found that both forms of training were effective in improving CRF with an increase in VO_{2} max, however there was no evidence that either training method was more effective than the other in improving cardiorespiratory fitness.

According to a 2020 study HIIT could be used as prehabilitation for men awaiting surgery for urological cancer and it may improve heart and lung fitness within a month before their surgery.

A 2021 study of randomly assigned twenty healthy women to two groups comparing high-intensity interval running (HIIT-R) with high-intensity functional training (HIFT). HIIT-R is a cardio-focused form of exercise while HIFT is centered around functional muscular training. The body composition, VO2 max, and muscle performance of the participants were measured both before and after the study was conducted. Results showed relatively similar results for body fat percentage and VO2 max for both groups, indicating that both cardio interval training and strength interval training are effective at decreasing body composition and aerobic fitness. The HIFT group demonstrated a drastic increase in muscle strength and the HIIT-R group displayed no change in muscle performance. High-intensity interval training is more effective at improving muscle endurance than cardio-centered exercise.

== See also ==
- Aerobic exercise – Low to high intensity physical exercise
- Anaerobic exercise – Physical exercise intense enough to cause lactate formation
- Bodyweight exercise – Form of strength training exercises
- Boxercise – High-intensity interval training based on boxing
- Continuous training – Exercise
- CrossFit – Branded fitness regimen
- Fartlek – Training method for runners
- Long slow distance – Aerobic endurance training
- Physical fitness – State of health and well-being
- Powerlifting – Sport
- Power training – Common type of speed and strength training
- Street workout – Physical activity performed mostly in outdoor parks
- Strength training – Exercise to improve strength
