= Interval training =

Type of training exercise

Interval training is a type of training exercise that involves a series of high-intensity workouts interspersed with rest or break periods. The high-intensity periods are typically at or close to anaerobic exercise, while the recovery periods involve activity of lower intensity. Varying the intensity of effort exercises the heart muscle, providing a cardiovascular workout, improving aerobic capacity and permitting the person to exercise for longer and/or at more intense levels.

Interval running provides a balanced mix of activity and rest, helping beginners gradually build their stamina and fitness without overexertion. Some interval running exercises include pyramid intervals, hill repeats, and staircase intervals. Soichi Sakamoto, who coached the University of Hawaii, was an early advocate of interval training for his competitive swimmers, and Indiana Coach James Counsilman, who had a Doctorate in Exercise Physiology was highly innovative in advancing the use of interval training for his swimmers as well.

Interval training can refer to the organization of any cardiovascular workout (e.g., cycling, running, swimming, rowing). It is prominent in training routines for many sports, but is particularly employed by runners.

== Variations ==
=== Fartlek training ===
Fartlek training, developed in Sweden, incorporates aspects of interval training with regular distance running. The name means 'speed play', and consists of distance running with "bursts of harder running at more irregular points, lengths and speeds compared with interval training". For example, a fartlek training session might consist of a warm-up for 5–10 minutes; running at a steady, hard speed for 2 km; rapid walking for 5 minutes (recovery); sprints of 50–60 s interspersed with easy running; full-speed uphill for 200 m; rapid walking for one minute; repeating this routine until the time schedule has elapsed (a minimum of 45 minutes). The development of aerobic and anaerobic capacities, and the adaptability of fartlek – to mimic running during specific sports – are characteristics it shares with other types of interval training.

=== Walk-back sprinting ===
"Walk-back sprinting" is one example of interval training for runners, in which one sprints a short distance (anywhere from 100 to 800 metres), then walks back to the starting point (the recovery period), to repeat the sprint a certain number of times. To add challenge to the workout, each of these sprints may start at predetermined time intervals - e.g. 200 metre sprint, walk back, and sprint again, every 3 minutes. The time interval is intended to provide just enough recovery time. A runner will use this method of training mainly to add speed to their race and give them a finishing kick.

=== High-intensity interval training ===
High-intensity interval training attempts to decrease the overall volume of training by increasing the effort expended during the high-intensity intervals, which are interspersed with lower intensity periods or rest. In contrast, sprint training is actually the use of intense periods or timed intervals of exercise which exceed the energy expended during the timed intervals in high intensity training. The acronym DIRT is sometimes used to denote the variables : D = Distance of each speed interval, I = Interval of recovery between speed intervals, R = Repetitions of speed intervals, and T = Time of each interval.

== Effectiveness ==
Aerobic interval training may benefit exercisers by allowing them to burn more calories in a shorter period, and by improving aerobic capability at a faster rate, when compared with continuous-intensity exercise. In overweight and obese individuals, high intensity interval training employing four sets of four-minute intervals has been shown to improve VO_{2} max to a greater extent than isocaloric moderate continuous training, as well as to a greater extent than with a protocol using shorter, one-minute intervals.

Some exercisers find interval training less monotonous than continuous-intensity exercise. A number of studies confirm that in young and healthy individuals, sprint interval training appears to be as effective as continuous endurance training of moderate intensity, and has the benefit of requiring a reduced time commitment. There is some evidence that interval training is also beneficial for older individuals and for those with coronary artery disease, but further study is required to acquire further evidence.

Interval training can improve many aspects of human physiology. In athletes, it can enhance lactate threshold and improve VO_{2} max. Lactate threshold has been shown to be a significant factor in determining performance for long distance running events. An increase in an athlete's VO_{2} max allows them to intake more oxygen while exercising, enhancing the capability to sustain larger spans of aerobic effort. Studies have also shown interval training can induce endurance-like adaptations, corresponding to increased capacity for whole body and skeletal muscle lipid oxidation and enhanced peripheral vascular structure and function.

There is limited evidence that interval training assists in managing risk factors of many diseases, including metabolic syndrome, cardiovascular disease, obesity and diabetes. It does this by improving insulin action and sensitivity. Generating higher insulin sensitivity results in lower levels of insulin needed to lower glucose levels in the blood. This helps individuals with type 2 diabetes or metabolic syndrome control their glucose levels. A combination of interval training and continuous exercise increases cardiovascular fitness and raises HDL-cholesterol, which reduces the risk of cardiovascular disease. This type of training also decreases waist circumference, waist-to-hip ratio (WHR), and the sum of skin folds on the body.

This method of training may be more effective at inducing fat loss than simply training at a moderate intensity for the same duration. This is due to the metabolism-boosting effects of high intensity intervals.

== See also ==
- Hypoventilation training
- Continuous training
- Long slow distance
- vVO_{2}max
