= Anaerobic exercise =

Physical exercise intense enough to cause lactate formation

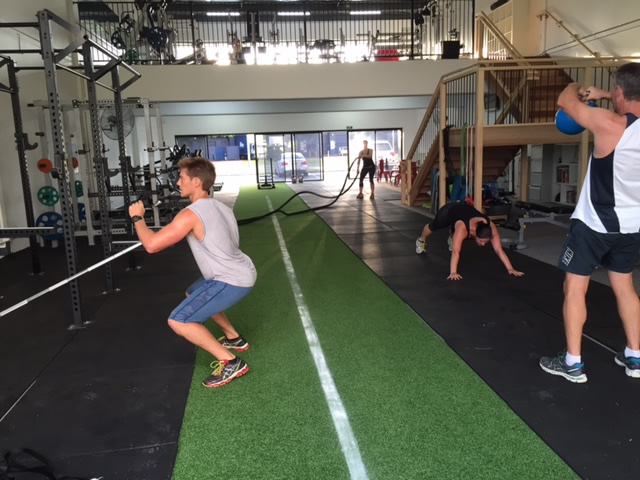
Strength training belongs to anaerobic exercise.

Anaerobic exercise is a type of exercise that breaks down glucose in the body without using oxygen; anaerobic means "without oxygen". This type of exercise leads to a buildup of lactic acid. In practical terms, this means that anaerobic exercise is more intense, but shorter in duration than aerobic exercise.

Fox and Haskell formula

The biochemistry of anaerobic exercise involves a process called glycolysis, in which glucose is converted to adenosine triphosphate (ATP), the primary source of energy for cellular reactions.

Anaerobic exercise may be used to help build endurance, muscle strength, and power.

== Metabolism ==
Anaerobic metabolism is a natural part of metabolic energy expenditure. Fast twitch muscles (as compared to slow twitch muscles) operate using anaerobic metabolic systems, such that any use of fast twitch muscle fibers leads to increased anaerobic energy expenditure. Intense exercise lasting upwards of four minutes (e.g. a mile race) may still have considerable anaerobic energy expenditure. An example is high-intensity interval training, an exercise strategy that is performed under anaerobic conditions at intensities that reach an excess of 90% of the maximum heart rate. Anaerobic energy expenditure is difficult to accurately quantify. Some methods estimate the anaerobic component of an exercise by determining the maximum accumulated oxygen deficit or measuring the lactic acid formation in muscle mass.

In contrast, aerobic exercise includes lower intensity activities performed for longer periods of time. Activities such as walking, jogging, rowing, and cycling require oxygen to generate the energy needed for prolonged exercise (i.e., aerobic energy expenditure). For sports that require repeated short bursts of exercise, the aerobic system acts to replenish and store energy during recovery periods to fuel the next energy burst. Therefore, training strategies for many sports demand that both aerobic and anaerobic systems be developed. The benefits of adding anaerobic exercise include improving cardiovascular endurance as well as build and maintaining muscle strength and losing weight.

As muscles contract, Calcium ions are released from the sarcoplasmic reticulum by release channels. These channels close and calcium pumps open to relax muscles. After extended exercise, the release channels can begin to leak and cause muscle fatigue.

The anaerobic energy systems are:

- The alactic anaerobic system, which consists of high energy phosphates, adenosine triphosphate, and creatine phosphate; and
- The lactic anaerobic system, which features anaerobic glycolysis.

High energy phosphates are stored in limited quantities within muscle cells. Anaerobic glycolysis exclusively uses glucose (and glycogen) as a fuel in the absence of oxygen, or more specifically, when ATP is needed at rates that exceed those provided by aerobic metabolism. The consequence of such rapid glucose breakdown is the formation of lactic acid (or more appropriately, its conjugate base lactate at biological pH levels). Physical activities that last up to about thirty seconds rely primarily on the former ATP-CP phosphagen system. Beyond this time, both aerobic and anaerobic glycolysis-based metabolic systems are used.

The by-product of anaerobic glycolysis—lactate—has traditionally been thought to be detrimental to muscle function. However, this appears likely only when lactate levels are very high. Elevated lactate levels are only one of many changes that occur within and around muscle cells during intense exercise that can lead to fatigue. Fatigue, which is muscle failure, is a complex subject that depends on more than just changes to lactate concentration. Energy availability, oxygen delivery, perception to pain, and other psychological factors all contribute to muscular fatigue. Elevated muscle and blood lactate concentrations are a natural consequence of any physical exertion. The effectiveness of anaerobic activity can be improved through training.

Anaerobic exercise also increases an individual's basal metabolic rate (BMR).

== Examples ==
Anaerobic exercises are high-intensity workouts completed over shorter durations, while aerobic exercises include variable-intensity workouts completed over longer durations. Some examples of anaerobic exercises include sprints, high-intensity interval training (HIIT), and strength training.

== See also ==
- Aerobic exercise
- Bioenergetic systems
- Citric acid cycle
- Cori cycle
- Margaria-Kalamen power test
- Pushups
- Strength training
- Weight training
