= VVO2max =

Biochemical measurement during exercise

vV̇O_{2}max (velocity at maximal oxygen uptake), also known as maximal aerobic speed (MAS), is an intense running or swimming pace. This is the minimum speed for which the organism's maximal oxygen uptake (VO_{2} max) is reached, after a few minutes of constantly maintaining this exercise intensity. At higher paces, any additional increase in power is provided by anaerobic processes. In an incremental exercise test, it is the first speed at which any increase in exercise intensity fails to elicit an increase in oxygen consumption.

The vV̇O_{2}max of world class middle- and long-distance runners may exceed 24 km/h or 2:30/km pace (15 mph or about 4:00/mile), making this speed slightly comparable to 3000 m race pace. For many athletes, vV̇O_{2}max may be slightly slower than 1500 m or mile race pace.

== Measuring vV̇O_{2}max ==
While a sophisticated lab may be required to obtain precise measures of vV̇O_{2}max, it can be estimated using a simple field test on a 400 m running track. In a 2015 study of 28 male rugby players, the authors measured vV̇O_{2}max and then had the subjects perform short time trials (TT) of various distances on the track. Using the average speed of a 2000 m TT gave the best estimate of vV̇O_{2}max, with the limits of agreement estimated as ±5%.

For a better estimate, several time trials at distances varying from 1200–2200 m could be run, with adequate rest between them (e.g. 48 h in Bellenger et al.). Then vV̇O_{2}max may be estimated from the following linear equation

vV̇O_{2}max = TTs × (0.117 × TTd + 0.766)

where TTs is the average time trial speed, and TTd is the time trial distance in km.

== Training at vV̇O_{2}max ==
Research by Véronique Billat has shown that training at vV̇O_{2}max pace improves both V̇O_{2}max and the economy required to maintain pace at this intensity.

Training at vV̇O_{2}max takes the form of interval workouts. For example, 3 × 1000 m with 3 minutes recovery between each repetition.

== Determining vV̇O_{2}max from V̇O_{2}max ==
The formula from Léger and Mercier links the V̇O_{2}max to the vV̇O_{2}max, supposing an ideal running technique.

vV̇O_{2}max = V̇O_{2}max / 3.5

where vV̇O_{2}max is in km/h and V̇O_{2}max is in mL/(kg•min).

Note: This formula is identical to that used to calculate the metabolic equivalent of task (MET) score for a given V̇O_{2}max estimation.

== See also ==
- High-intensity interval training
- Lactate threshold
- Respirometry
- Running economy
- Training effect
- VDOT
