= BodyAttack =

Group fitness program

BodyAttack is a commercial group-fitness sports inspired cardio workout program including some sports-derived movements, aimed primarily at developing cardiovascular fitness. The program is created and distributed by Les Mills International. There is a release with new music and movements every three months. In the UK, it is offered at around 1,300 health and fitness facilities, approximately one fifth of such facilities in the country. It consists of a standardized class that is either 55, 45 or 30 minutes in length, led by a certified instructor who leads participants through various exercises to a contemporary music soundtrack. Like BodyPump and other Les Mills programs, the movements, exercises and music are standardized for all instructors. The aim is to develop numerous domains of physical fitness, particularly cardiovascular fitness and stamina.

== Structure ==
The structure of a BodyAttack class never changes, although various tracks may be skipped to shorten the workout to either a 45 or 30 minute workout.

The class is divided into two blocks of work, each of which has one cardio peak. Each block consists of several tracks, where each track is a routine set to a specific song. The songs and routines are changed periodically, but the exercise focus of each track remains consistent. The first block starts with a warm up and peaks with a plyometrics track. The second block starts with circular running and peaks with a power track. The routines are designed with the goal of maximizing participants' heart rates during the two peak tracks, particularly during the power track.

The music and routines for each track are changed every quarter-year. Each new set of music and routines is numbered sequentially, with past track lists being referred to by number. For example, the track list in use for the first quarter of 2019 is referred to as "BodyAttack 109".

== Formats ==
A full 55 minute class consists of 11 tracks in a fixed order. Instructors are required use one of the formats provided by Les Mills and may not change the order or format of tracks.

Before BodyAttack 87, track 5 was focused on upper body strength and conditioning and there was an additional track between tracks 9 and 10 for lower body strength and conditioning.

BodyAttack 121 (released Q3 2023), introduced a new Circuit track 3 that instructors can use an alternative to the Aerobic track. The Circuit track is meant to be easier to learn, easier to teach, and provide something with a more modern feel. As part of this change, another 30 minute format was added to allow instructors to teach the new Circuit track in place of the Mixed Impact track.

BodyAttack 123 (released Q1 2024), added another new track, the track 9 Circuit. This is similar to the track 3 circuit, where the track focuses on being more simple, easier to coach, and modern. Instructors can choose whether to teach the traditional Power track, or use the track 9 Circuit as an alternative.

=== 55 Minute Format ===
In the 55 minute format, where there is a track A and B, only one of the tracks are taught.

- First Block
  - Track 1, Warmup. The focus is on warming up the body for the rest of the workout.
  - Track 2, Mixed Impact. This track focuses warming up the legs for the next track, and getting the heart rate up.
  - Track 3A, Circuit. This track uses simple, easy to teach movements, such as running, jumping jacks, and push ups, to increase the heart rate more.
  - Track 3B, Aerobic. This track uses big, aerobic movements such as jumping jacks and single knees, to further increase the heart rate.
  - Track 4, Plyometric. First cardio peak of the class with big, explosive movements such as plyometric lunges, jump squats, burpees and skaters.
  - Track 5, Athletic Strength. A combination of conditioning and strength moves such as pushups, triceps pushups, squats and lunges to condition the entire body.
- Second Block
  - Track 6, Running. With a focus on athletic movements to improve running motion, participants also run around the room to bring the heart rate back up.
  - Track 7, Agility. This track is designed for speed and agility work. Typical moves include ladder runs, side bounces and forward sprints.
  - Track 8, Interval. This track uses big movements, such as kicks, side flicks and running to get the heart rate up and then lighter moves to bring the pulse back down for each interval.
  - Track 9A, Circuit. This alternative to the traditional power track, uses simpler to teach movements such as running, high knees and burpees, to bring the heart rate right up to its final peak.
  - Track 9B, Power. The second cardio peak, often including high knees, burpees, jumping jacks and other plyometric moves.
  - Track 10, Core. This track targets the entire core (abs, back and posterior muscles) frequently utilizing crunches and variations on planks and hovers.
  - Track 11, Cooldown. This track is focused on stretching and bringing the heart rate down.

=== 45 Minute Format ===
A shorter runtime is achieved by skipping some tracks from the full 55 minute format. There are four options for this format:

- Option 1: Tracks 1, 2, 4, 5, 6, 7, 9A or 9B, 10, and 11; tracks 3B (aerobic) and 8 (interval) are skipped.
- Option 2: Tracks 1, 2, 4, 5, 7, 8, 9A or 9B, 10, and 11; tracks 3B (aerobic) and 6 (running) are skipped.
- Option 3: Tracks 1, 3A (circuit), 4, 5, 6, 7, 9A or 9B, 10, and 11.
- Option 4: Tracks 1, 3A (circuit), 4, 5, 6, 7, 9A or 9B, 10 and 11.

There is no option to offer the 3B (aerobic) track in the 45 minute format.

=== 30 Minute Format ===
The shortest format which includes a modified "express" version of track 5. There are 3 options for this format:

- Option 1: Tracks 1, 3A (circuit), 4, 7, 9A or 9B, and Express 5.
- Option 2: Tracks 1, 2, 4, 7, 9A or 9B, and Express 5.
- Option 3: Tracks 1, 2, 4, 6, 9A or 9B and Express 5.

Tracks 3B (aerobic), 8 (interval), 10 (core), and 11 (cooldown) are always skipped in the 30 minute format.

== Research ==
Few published studies have investigated the BodyAttack program scientifically. One study investigated the energy expenditure and oxygen consumption of three male and three female participants (mostly instructors) during a typical 55-minute BodyAttack class, undertaken in a controlled laboratory setting. Average energy expenditure was 660kcal for the male participants and 602kcal for the female participants.
