= Lactate threshold =

Aspect of physiology

Lactate inflection point (LIP) is the exercise intensity at which the blood concentration of lactate and/or lactic acid begins to increase rapidly. It is often expressed as 85% of maximum heart rate or 75% of maximum oxygen intake. When exercising at or below the lactate threshold, any lactate produced by the muscles is removed by the body without it building up.

The onset of blood lactate accumulation (OBLA) is often confused with the lactate threshold. With an exercise intensity higher than the threshold the lactate production exceeds the rate at which it can be broken down. The blood lactate concentration will show an increase equal to 4.0 mM; it then accumulates in the muscle and then moves to the bloodstream.

Regular endurance exercise leads to adaptations in skeletal muscle which raises the threshold at which lactate levels will rise. This is mediated via activation of the protein receptor PGC-1α, which alters the isoenzyme composition of the lactate dehydrogenase (LDH) complex and decreases the activity of lactate dehydrogenase A (LDHA), while increasing the activity of lactate dehydrogenase B (LDHB).

== Training types ==
The lactate threshold is a useful measure for deciding exercise intensity for training and racing in endurance sports (e.g., long distance running, cycling, rowing, long distance swimming and cross country skiing), but varies between individuals and can be increased with training.

=== Interval training ===
Interval training alternates work and rest periods allowing the body to temporarily exceed the lactate threshold at a high intensity, and then recover (reduce blood-lactate). This type of training uses the ATP-PC and the lactic acid system while exercising, which provides the most energy when there are short bursts of high intensity exercise followed by a recovery period. Interval training can take the form of many different types of exercise and should closely replicate the movements found in the sport being trained for. Interval training can be adjusted to the individual, however it is important to consider the intensity of each interval, duration or distance of each interval, length of rest/recovery, number of repetitions, frequency of training and recovery type.

=== Fartlek training ===
Fartlek and interval training are similar, the main difference being in the structure of the exercise. Fartlek is a Swedish word, meaning "speed play". This type of training is a combination of continuous (generally aerobic) and interval training (generally anaerobic), involving consistent changes of pace/intensity throughout the session.

=== Aerobic and anaerobic training ===
Aerobic training will not increase lactic acid tolerance, however, it will increase the lactate threshold. Anaerobic training will increase tolerance of the effects of lactic acid over time, allowing the muscles’ ability to work in the presence of increased lactic acid. Training at or slightly above the lactate threshold improves the lactic acid tolerance.

== Measuring lactate threshold ==
Muscles continuously produce lactate, even at rest; resting blood lactate levels are usually in the 1–2 mmol/L range. Although the lactate threshold is defined as the point when lactic acid starts to accumulate, some testers approximate this by crossing the lactate threshold and using the point at which lactate reaches a concentration of 4 mmol/L of lactate. Accurately measuring the lactate blood concentration involves taking blood samples (normally a pinprick to the finger, earlobe or thumb) during a 'ramp' test where the exercise intensity is progressively increased.

The chemistry behind the blood lactate meter takes place in the single-use strips. These strips are coated with a layer of the enzyme lactate oxidase. When the blood sample hits this layer in the presence of atmospheric oxygen, the enzyme converts the lactate to pyruvate. The byproduct of this reaction is hydrogen peroxide. The hydrogen peroxide is then oxidized to hydrogen ions, oxygen, and electrons. This is all accomplished by applying a small voltage to the strip to initiate the reaction. The electrodes in the test strip then measure the current produced in the reaction, and convert it to a voltage. The device magnifies the voltage reading and corrects for ambient temperature before converting back to a blood lactate reading (in units of mmol or mg/dL) to display on the screen.

In addition to blood lactate sampling, non-invasive portable Near-Infrared Spectroscopy (NIRS) sensors are utilized to measure muscle oxygen saturation (SmO2) dynamics as a reliable proxy for determining physiological thresholds and training zones during exercise.

== Accuracy of blood samples ==
Blood samples are a popular way of measuring the lactate blood concentration, however there are many factors that may affect the sample. Every individual has a different health status, thus the results from the blood lactate response can vary from factors prior to exercise such as the glycogen status of the participant and ambient temperature. “Furthermore, the lactate concentration measured may vary depending on the sampling site sweat contamination, and the accuracy of the lactate analyser.” There are many factors that may give this test a false reading; it is important that an individual takes these into consideration, to receive an accurate test.

== Lactate measurement of aerobic and anaerobic thresholds ==
The aerobic threshold (AeT or AerT) is sometimes defined equivalently to the lactate threshold (LT); as the exercise intensity at which blood lactate concentrations rise above resting levels. In contrast, at the anaerobic threshold (AnT) the exercise is at an intensity beyond which blood lactate concentration is linearly related to exercise intensity, but increases with both exercise intensity and duration. The blood lactate concentration at the anaerobic threshold is called the "maximum steady-state lactate concentration" (MLSS).

AeT is the exercise intensity at which anaerobic energy pathways start to operate, considered to be around 65-85% of an individual's maximum heart rate. Some have suggested this is where blood lactate reaches a concentration of 2 mmol/litre (at rest it is around 1). The anaerobic energy system increases the ability to produce blood lactate during maximal exercise, resulting from an increased amount of glycogen stores and glycolytic enzymes.

In zone-based polarized training methodologies, LT1 is commonly used to designate the linear inflection point, often observed around blood lactate levels of 2.0 mmol/L, while LT2 is commonly used to designate the non-linear inflection point, often observed around blood lactate levels of 4.0 mmol/L. Polarised training, which allocates approximately 80 percent of weekly training volume below LT1 and a smaller share above LT2, was established in observations of elite endurance athletes and has since become a standard framework for endurance prescription in cyclic sports.

== See also ==
- Aerobic exercise
- Anaerobic exercise
- Running economy
- VO_{2} max
- vVO_{2}max
- Exogenous Lactate
