= Jack Daniels (coach) =

American running coach (1933–2025)

Personal information
- Born: Jack Tupper Daniels; April 26, 1933 Detroit, Michigan, U.S.
- Died: September 12, 2025 (aged 92) Cortland, New York, U.S.

Sport
- Sport: Modern pentathlon
Medal record
Men's modern pentathlon
Representing United States
Olympic Games
| Silver medal – second place | 1956 Melbourne | Team |
| Bronze medal – third place | 1960 Rome | Team |

Jack Tupper Daniels (April 26, 1933 – September 12, 2025) was an American exercise physiologist, running coach and a coach of Olympic athletes. Named "The World's Best Coach" by Runner's World magazine, he led SUNY Cortland runners to eight NCAA Division III National Championships, 31 individual national titles, and more than 130 All-America awards. Daniels outlined his training philosophies in the 1998 book, Daniels' Running Formula. He mentored and coached some of the top distance runners in the United States, including Jim Ryun, Joan Benoit, Ken Martin, Jerry Lawson, and Magdalena Lewy-Boulet.

== Early life ==
Daniels was born in Detroit, Michigan on April 26, 1933. He was an accomplished collegiate swimmer at the Colorado School of Mines and the University of Montana, graduating from the latter in 1955. He won a team silver medal in the 1956 Summer Olympics and a team bronze medal in the 1960 Summer Olympics for his participation in the modern pentathlon. After studying anatomy and physiology at the Royal Gymnastic Central Institute in Stockholm in 1959, he earned a master's degree in physical education from the University of Oklahoma in 1965 and a doctoral degree in exercise physiology from the University of Wisconsin–Madison in 1969.

== Coaching ==
Daniels was head coach of the cross country program at Oklahoma City University from 1961 to 1965. His doctoral research included altitude research with the Federal Aviation Agency, leading to a consulting role with the American track team for the 1968 Olympics in Mexico City. He then coached the Peruvian national team for one year before coaching the men's distance program at the University of Texas from 1969 to 1972.

After working for Nike from 1980 to 1986, Daniels served as the men's and women's track and field/cross country coach at the State University of New York at Cortland for 17 years, while also serving as a physical education professor for the college. Across his coaching career with the Red Dragons, Daniels has coached 30 individual Division III NCAA National Champions, eight NCAA National Team Champions and 130 All-Americans.

In 2005, Daniels was hired to head the U.S. Distance Running Program at Northern Arizona University's Center for High Altitude Training. After the center closed in 2009, he coached at Brevard College from 2010 to 2012, and was hired as the head coach of the Wells College cross country program in 2013.

== VDOT ==
In the 1970s, Daniels and his colleague, Jimmy Gilbert, examined the performances and known VO_{2}max values of elite middle and long distance runners. Although the laboratory determined VO_{2}max values of these runners may have been different, equally performing runners were assigned equal aerobic profiles. Daniels labeled these "pseudoVO_{2}max" or "effective VO_{2}max" values as VDOT values. According to Daniels, VDOT is a shortened form of V̇O_{2}max, properly stated as "V-dot-O_{2}max".

With the result of a recent competition, a runner can find his or her VDOT value and determine an "equivalent performance" at a different race distance. Given that runners with identical VO_{2}max values may have differences in running economy/efficiency, biomechanics, and mental toughness, Daniels concluded that VDOT is, due to this holistic view, a better value from which to assess fitness and determine training paces.

== Training philosophy ==
Daniels divided running performance into six components. Daniels argued that each of these components requires a specific training intensity to improve.

- The Cardiovascular System, specifically the body's ability to transport oxygen.
- The Running muscles' ability to use oxygen.
- The Lactate threshold – the ability to cope with, and minimize, lactic acid in the blood.
- The VO_{2}max – the maximum oxygen uptake capacity.
- Speed, for example leg turnover.
- The Running economy – the efficiency of the runner's movements.

=== Training intensities ===
Daniels used five specific training intensities to improve the different components above. A runner can determine the correct speed for each intensity based on the VDOT from a recent performance.

==== Easy / Long (E/L) pace ====
At 60–79% of maximum heart rate (HR_{max}), this non-straining intensity is used for recovery runs, warm-up, cool-down and long runs. The primary purpose is to build a base for more intense workouts by strengthening the heart and increasing the muscles' ability to use oxygen, and to recover between hard workouts. Daniels recommends that most training miles are performed in E pace.

Typical E runs include continuous runs up to about an hour.

==== Marathon (M) pace ====
At 80–85% HR_{max}, this intensity is primarily aimed towards runners training for the marathon. The pace is one at which the runner hopes to compete. The pace can be included in other programs for a more intense workout, especially if the runner feels fresh and there is enough time to recover afterwards.

M-runs are performed as continuous runs up to about two hours, or as long interval training.

==== Threshold (T) pace ====
At 82–88% HR_{max}, this intensity is aimed to raise the lactate threshold. The runner should be able to sustain this pace for up to 60 minutes during racing. Daniels described this intensity as "comfortably hard". In elite runners, the pace matches the half marathon one, while less trained runners will run at around 10k pace. Daniels pointed out the importance of keeping the given pace to reap the benefits of the training.

T runs are typically performed as continuous "tempo" runs for 20 minutes or more, or as "cruise" interval training with 3 to 10 long bouts of about 3 to 15 minutes each, having 20%–25% rest intervals in between. "T" runs of longer than 20 minutes can be done at slightly reduced pace, according to a table in his book. No more than 10% of the weekly miles should be run at T pace.

==== Interval (I) pace ====
Intensity at 97–100% HR_{max}. This intensity stresses the VO_{2}max to raise the maximum oxygen uptake capacity. Since the pace is very intense, it can only be sustained for up to 12 minutes during racing. To cope with the intensity, and to train for longer periods of time, this training is performed as interval training, hence the name. The interval between each work bout should be a little less than the time of the work bout. Optimum intervals are 3–5 minutes long. Under Daniels' theory, there is no benefit to exceeding 5 minutes at this pace, meaning that despite the popularity of mile-repeats in many running groups, Daniels discouraged them for people whose pace is slower than about 5:00/mile, preferring shorter intervals such as 1200 meters.

For example, an I session can be 6 x 800 m at I pace with 400 m recovery jogs. At most 8% of the weekly training miles should be I pace.

==== Repetition (R) pace ====
R pace is very fast training aimed to improve speed and running economy. The training is performed as short interval training, with typically 200 m, 300 m, or 400 m work outs, with full recovery intervals in between. No more than 5% of the weekly miles should be R pace.

== Critique ==
Tim Noakes has proposed that maximal exercise performance is regulated by a "central governor" rather than a limiting cardiorespiratory function (i.e. VO2 max). Noakes challenges the explanatory power of Daniels' training model (Cardiovascular/Anaerobic) stating that there is a lack of published evidence supporting the claim that each training intensity only improves one of the six physiological components described above. He also states that Daniels' division in components is also not considered complete, e.g. leaving out the muscles' ability to absorb the pounding of running a marathon. But he has acknowledged the efficacy of Daniels' training methods, and stated that science may one day catch up with the explanations, but his methods are effective.

== Death ==
Daniels died in Cortland, New York on September 12, 2025, at the age of 92.
