= Fick principle =

Principle applied to the measurement of blood flow to an organ

The Fick principle states that blood flow to an organ can be calculated using a marker substance if the following information is known:

- Amount of marker substance taken up by the organ per unit time
- Concentration of marker substance in arterial blood supplying the organ
- Concentration of marker substance in venous blood leaving the organ

Developed by Adolf Eugen Fick (1829–1901), the Fick principle has been applied to the measurement of cardiac output. Its underlying principles may also be applied in a variety of clinical situations.

In Fick's original method, the "organ" was the entire human body and the marker substance was oxygen. The first published mention was in conference proceedings from July 9, 1870 from a lecture he gave at that conference; it is this publishing that is most often used by articles to cite Fick's contribution. The principle may be applied in different ways. For example, if the blood flow to an organ is known, together with the arterial and venous concentrations of the marker substance, the uptake of marker substance by the organ may then be calculated.

== Variables ==
In Fick's original method, the following variables are measured:

- V̇O_{2}, oxygen consumption in mL of pure gaseous oxygen per minute. This may be measured using a spirometer within a closed rebreathing circuit incorporating a CO_{2} absorber
- C_{a}, the oxygen content of blood taken from the pulmonary vein (representing oxygenated blood = arterial blood)
- C_{v}, the oxygen content of blood from an intravenous cannula (representing deoxygenated blood)

== Equation ==
From these values, we know that:

$$\ce{\dot VO2} = (CO \times\ C_a) - (CO \times\ C_v)$$

where

- CO = Cardiac Output
- C_{a} = Oxygen content of arterial blood
- C_{v} = Oxygen content of mixed venous blood

This allows us to say

$$CO = \frac\ce{\dot VO2}{C_a - C_v}$$

and hence calculate cardiac output.

Note that (C_{a} – C_{v}) is also known as the arteriovenous oxygen difference.

== Assumed Fick determination ==
In reality, this method is rarely used due to the difficulty of collecting and analysing the gas concentrations. However, by using an assumed value for oxygen consumption, cardiac output can be closely approximated without the cumbersome and time-consuming oxygen consumption measurement. This is sometimes called an assumed Fick determination.

A commonly used value for O_{2} consumption at rest is 125 mL O_{2} per minute per square meter of body surface area.

== Underlying principles ==
The Fick principle relies on the observation that the total uptake of (or release of) a substance by the peripheral tissues is equal to the product of the blood flow to the peripheral tissues and the arterial-venous concentration difference (gradient) of the substance. In the determination of cardiac output, the substance most commonly measured is the oxygen content of blood thus giving the arteriovenous oxygen difference, and the flow calculated is the flow across the pulmonary system. This gives a simple way to calculate the cardiac output:

$$\text{Cardiac Output} = \frac {\text{oxygen consumption}} {\text{arteriovenous oxygen difference}}$$

Assuming there is no intracardiac shunt, the pulmonary blood flow equals the systemic blood flow. Measurement of the arterial and venous oxygen content of blood involves the sampling of blood from the pulmonary artery (low oxygen content) and from the pulmonary vein (high oxygen content). In practice, sampling of peripheral arterial blood is a surrogate for pulmonary venous blood. Determination of the oxygen consumption of the peripheral tissues is more complex.

The calculation of the arterial and venous oxygen concentration of the blood is a straightforward process. Almost all oxygen in the blood is bound to hemoglobin molecules in the red blood cells. Measuring the content of hemoglobin in the blood and the percentage of saturation of hemoglobin (the oxygen saturation of the blood) is a simple process and is readily available to physicians. Using the fact that each gram of hemoglobin can carry 1.34 mL of O_{2}, the oxygen content of the blood (either arterial or venous) can be estimated by the following formula:

$$\text{Oxygen Content of blood} = \left [\text{Hb} \right] \left ( \text{g/dl} \right ) \ \times\ 1.34 \left ( \text{mL}\ \ce{O2} /\text{g of Hb} \right ) \times\ O_2^{\text{saturation fraction}}  +\ 0.0032\ \times\ P_\ce{O2} (\text{torr})$$

Assuming a hemoglobin concentration of 15 g/dL and an oxygen saturation of 99%, the oxygen concentration of arterial blood is approximately 200 mL of O_{2} per L.

The saturation of mixed venous blood is approximately 75% in health. Using this value in the above equation, the oxygen concentration of mixed venous blood is approximately 150 mL of O_{2} per L.

Therefore, using the assumed Fick determination, the approximated cardiac output for an average man (1.9 m^2) is:

Cardiac Output = (125 mL O_{2}/minute × 1.9) / (200 mL O_{2}/L − 150 mL O_{2}/L) = 4.75 L/min

Cardiac output may also be estimated with the Fick principle using production of carbon dioxide as a marker substance.

== Use in renal physiology ==
The principle can also be used in renal physiology to calculate renal blood flow.

In this context, it is not oxygen which is measured, but a marker such as para-aminohippurate. However, the principles are essentially the same.
