= Cardiovascular fitness =

Heart-related component of physical fitness

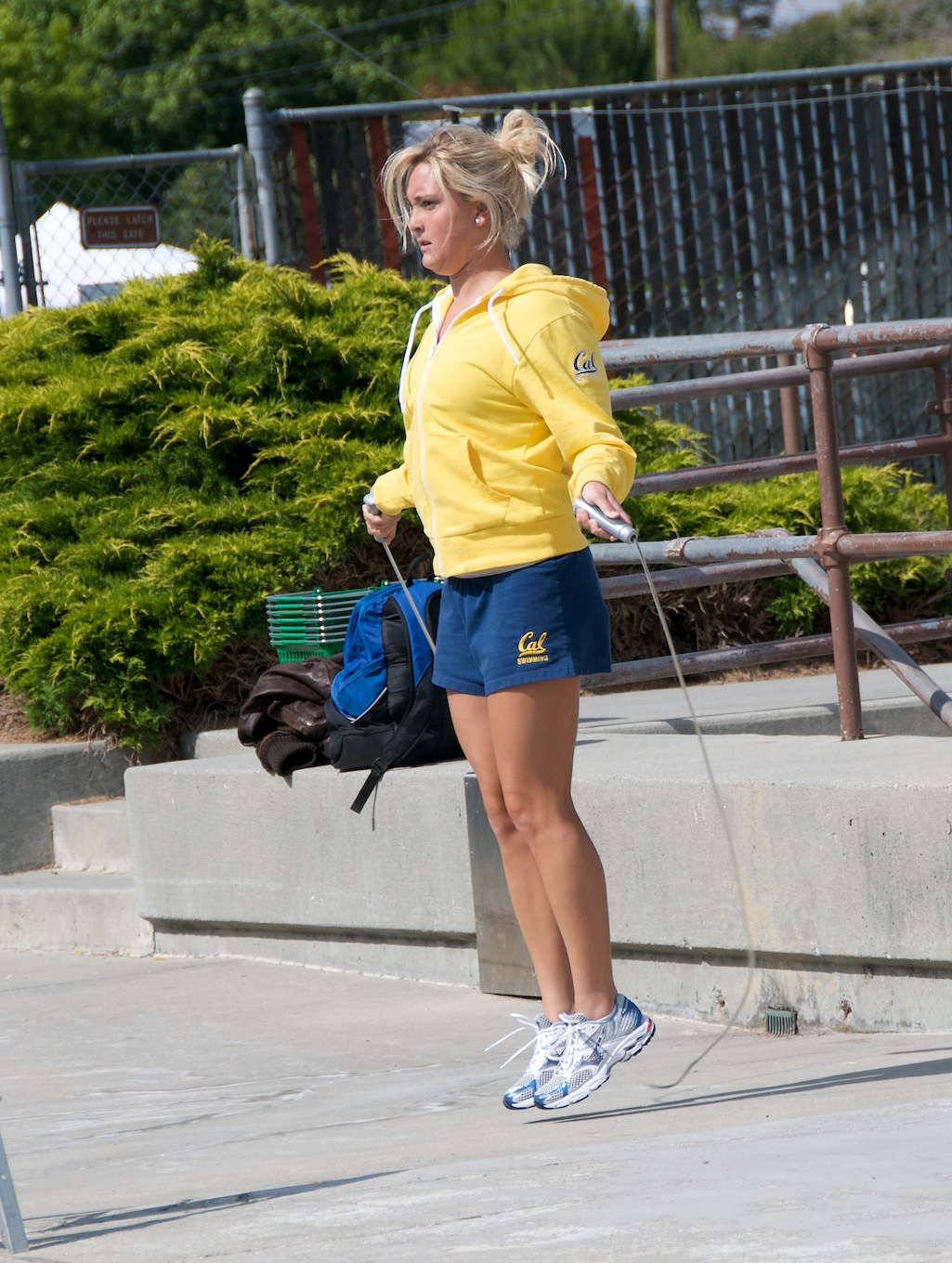
A young woman jumping rope. This exercise is a type of cardio and increases cardiovascular fitness.

Cardiovascular fitness is a component of physical fitness, which refers to a person's ability to deliver oxygen to the working muscles, including the heart. Cardiovascular fitness is improved by sustained endurance training and is affected by many physiological parameters, including cardiac output (determined by heart rate multiplied by stroke volume), vascular patency, and maximal oxygen consumption (i.e. VO_{2} max).

Cardiovascular fitness measures how well the heart and blood vessels can transport oxygen to the muscles during exercise. It is an important component of overall fitness and has been linked to reduced risk of cardiovascular disease, improved cognitive function, and increased longevity. A study published in the American Journal of Epidemiology found that higher levels of cardiovascular fitness were associated with a lower risk of mortality from all causes, including cancer.

== Physiological basis of fitness ==
Cardiovascular fitness generally relates to the circulatory system's aerobic capacity, or ability to supply tissues with oxygen. As aerobic/anaerobic capacity increases, general metabolism rises, muscle metabolism is enhanced, haemoglobin rises, buffers in the bloodstream increase, venous return is improved, stroke volume is improved, and the blood bed becomes more able to adapt readily to varying demands. Each of these results of cardiovascular fitness/cardiorespiratory conditioning will have a direct positive effect on muscular endurance, and an indirect effect on strength and flexibility.

To build aerobic capacity, an individual needs to train or participate in activities that will strengthen the heart and other circulatory tissues, such as aerobic exercise. A 2005 Cochrane review demonstrated that physical activity interventions are effective for increasing cardiovascular fitness. A cardiovascular ("cardio") workout consists of exercises that increases heart rate for a prolonged period. The American Heart Association recommends at least 150 minutes of moderate-intensity aerobic exercise or 75 minutes of vigorous-intensity aerobic exercise per week to improve cardiovascular fitness and reduce the risk of cardiovascular disease. A systematic review and meta-analysis published in the European Journal of Preventive Cardiology found that both moderate and high-intensity exercise improved cardiovascular fitness, but high-intensity exercise produced greater improvements.

== Assessing cardiovascular fitness ==
Cardiovascular fitness can be assessed through various methods, including maximal oxygen uptake (V̇O_{2max}), which is the maximal amount of oxygen that can be used during exercise. Biomarkers, such as those used for assessing blood lipids, inflammation, glucose tolerance, and hemostasis, may be used to monitor progress during the development of cardiovascular fitness.

== The role of exercise in cardiovascular fitness ==
Regular physical activity is essential for improving cardiovascular fitness. The American Heart Association recommends at least 150 minutes of moderate-intensity aerobic exercise or 75 minutes of vigorous-intensity aerobic exercise per week to improve cardiovascular fitness and reduce the risk of cardiovascular disease.

=== Cardiovascular changes attributed to aerobic exercise ===
During aerobic exercise, cardiac output and oxygen consumption (VO2) increase, following the Fick equation: VO2 = Cardiac Output x Arteriovenous oxygen difference. Cardiac output results from stroke volume and heart rate (CO = HR x SV). Age-adjusted maximum heart rate is estimated with HRmax = 220 bpm - [subject's age]. Stroke volume rises due to enhanced preload and myocardial contractility, though excessively high heart rates may reduce cardiac output by shortening left ventricular filling time.

Chronic aerobic exercise improves cardiovascular function through adaptations like increased left and right ventricular function, raising cardiac output and maximum oxygen consumption. With increasing age, the large arteries has increased stiffness which results in hemodynamic changes that can be associated with dementia and cardiovascular kidney disease. Exercise training results in vascular changes, such as reduced arterial stiffness and better endothelium-dependent vasodilation (from nitric oxide). Training for just 6 month can reverse the arterial aging of 4 years. These adaptations help mitigate age-related declines in cardiac performance. While people with cardiovascular disease (CVD) see lesser structural adaptations, exercise remains beneficial, underscoring its role in cardiac rehabilitation.

Physical activity reduces CVD mortality, with high fitness levels linked to fewer CVD risk factors, including obesity and hypertension. For instance, Barry et al. found that individuals with low cardiorespiratory fitness had double the mortality risk of fit individuals, regardless of BMI, while individuals with high cardiorespiratory fitness had similar survival rates (again, regardless of BMI).

=== Prescribing exercise: type, dosing, and adverse effects ===
Moderate-intensity continuous exercise is standard for CVD patients, though high-intensity interval training (HIIT) may offer superior cardiorespiratory and cardiac improvements. The Physical Activity Federal Guidelines suggest 150 minutes of moderate or 75 minutes of vigorous weekly aerobic activity, yet over half of adults fall short of these targets. Studies show even low doses of activity (e.g., <6 miles of running per week) can significantly reduce all-cause and CVD mortality risks.

Resistance training complements aerobic exercise by enhancing muscular fitness, which reduces cardiovascular risk factors, improves insulin sensitivity, and decreases atherosclerosis. It's recommended to incorporate resistance exercise twice weekly for at least 15–20 minutes, particularly in older adults and those with heart failure.

Excessive endurance training can negatively impact cardiac function, causing myocardial injury markers, chamber dilation, and reduced right ventricular function. Long-term, this training may result in adverse remodeling, fibrosis, and increased arrhythmia risk, notably atrial fibrillation. Optimal exercise volumes are under 30 miles of running or 46 miles of walking per week, as higher volumes may reduce cardiovascular benefits.

Despite the risks of excessive exercise, the primary public health concern remains insufficient physical activity.
