= L-lactate oxidase =

Oxidoreductase enzyme

Identifiers
- EC no.: 1.1.3.2

Databases
- BRENDA: enzyme data
- ExPASy: NiceZyme view
- KEGG: enzyme entry
- MetaCyc: metabolic pathway
- Rhea: reactions
- PDB structures: RCSB PDB PDBe PDBsum
Search
- PMC: articles
- PubMed: articles
- NCBI: proteins

L-lactate oxidase (EC 1.1.3.2) is an enzyme that catalyzes the chemical reaction:

L-lactic acid
O_{2}
H_{2}O_{2}
O_{2}
H_{2}O_{2}
pyruvic acid

It belongs to the family of oxidoreductases (enzymes involved in redox reactions), specifically those acting on the CH−OH group of donors with oxygen as acceptor. The systematic name of this enzyme class is (S)-lactate:oxygen 2-oxidoreductase. It employs one cofactor, flavin mononucleotide. The amino acid sequence of this enzyme is similar to that in lactate 2-monooxygenase, which converts lactate to acetate and carbon dioxide. The difference in the products formed has been ascribed to differences in the stability of an intermediate complex.

The enzyme was first isolated and characterised from the bacterium Aerococcus viridans. The relevant genes from Streptococcus iniae were subsequently cloned to allow further study. These developments have allowed the enzyme to be used in biosensors which measure the concentration of lactic acid in blood.

== Structural studies ==
Tertiary structures have been solved for this class of enzymes, with the PDB accession code PDB: 2DU2.
