= Arteriovenous oxygen difference =

Medical measurement

The arteriovenous oxygen difference, or a-vO_{2} diff, is the difference in the oxygen content of the blood between the arterial blood and the venous blood. It is an indication of how much oxygen is removed from the blood in capillaries as the blood circulates in the body. The a-vO_{2} diff and cardiac output are the main factors that allow variation in the body's total oxygen consumption, and are important in measuring VO_{2}. The a-vO_{2} diff is usually measured in millilitres of oxygen per 100 millilitres of blood (mL/100 mL).

== Measurement ==
The arteriovenous oxygen difference is usually taken by comparing the difference in the oxygen concentration of oxygenated blood in the femoral, brachial, or radial artery and the oxygen concentration in the deoxygenated blood from the mixed supply found in the pulmonary artery (as an indicator of the typical mixed venous supply).

Put in simple terms:

a-vO_{2} diff = C_{a} – C_{v}

where:
- C_{a} = the oxygen concentration of arterial blood (oxygenated blood)
- C_{v} = the oxygen concentration of venous blood (deoxygenated blood)

The usual unit for a-vO_{2} diff is millilitres of oxygen per 100 millilitres of blood (mL/100 mL), however, particularly in medical uses, other units may be used, such as micro moles per millilitre (μmol/mL).

In practice, a-vO_{2} diff may be determined using the Fick Principle rather than by taking direct blood samples. In order to do so oxygen consumption (VO_{2}) may be measured using a spirometer to detect gaseous concentrations in exhaled air compared to inhaled air, while cardiac output can be determined using a Doppler ultrasound.

Arterial blood will generally contain an oxygen concentration of around 20 mL/100 mL. Venous blood with an oxygen concentration of 15 mL/100 mL would therefore lead to typical values of the a-vO_{2} diff at rest of around 5 mL/100 mL. During intense exercise, however, the a-vO_{2} diff can increase to as much as 16 mL/100 mL due to the working muscles extracting far more oxygen from the blood than they do at rest.

Alternatively, in order to find the efficiency of the lungs in replenishing blood oxygen levels, the a-vO_{2} diff may instead be taken by comparing blood from the pulmonary artery and the pulmonary vein; in this case a negative value for a-vO_{2} diff would be obtained as the oxygen content of the blood would have increased.

== Impacts of exercise ==
Physical exercise leads to an increase in the arteriovenous oxygen difference in all individuals. As exercise intensities increase, the muscles increase the amount of oxygen they extract from the blood, and this therefore results in further increases in a-vO_{2} diff.

The maximum a-vO_{2} diff is also usually greater in trained athletes than in untrained individuals. This is a result of aerobic exercise leading to hypertrophy of the slow twitch muscle fibres mainly due to increased capillarisation. The increase in capillary beds in the muscle means that blood supply to that muscle can be greater and diffusion of oxygen, carbon dioxide, and other metabolites increases. With training the muscles also improve in their ability to extract oxygen from the blood and process the oxygen, possibly due to adaptations of the mitochondria and an increase in the muscle's myoglobin content.

Research has shown that following the commencement of exercise there is a delay in the increase of the a-vO_{2} diff, and that a-vO_{2} diff only has a marginal impact in the total change in VO_{2} in the early stages of exercise. The bulk of the early increase in oxygen consumption after a sudden change in exercise levels results from increased cardiac output. However it has also been found that the increase in the maximal a-vO_{2} diff resulting from adaptations to a physical training program can account for most of the difference in VO_{2} max in subjects participating in sub-maximal exercise.

== In medicine ==
Arteriovenous oxygen difference is also used in other areas of study such as medicine and medical research. For example, the a-vO_{2} diff has been used to measure cerebral blood flow in comatose patients, assisting with their diagnosis and treatment. The a-vO_{2} diff has also been used to determine the effects of physical training in coronary patients.

== See also ==
- Blood gas
- Oxygen saturation

== Sources ==
- Malpeli, Robert; et al. (2010). Physical Education: VCE Units 3 & 4 (5th ed.). South Melbourne, Victoria: Cengage Learning Australia. ISBN 978-0-17-018692-6.
