= Paceband =

An example commercial pre-printed paceband

A paceband is a wristband, sometimes made of a strip of waterproof paper, that lists expected split times for a running race. When used in conjunction with a stopwatch, a paceband can assist athletes in maintaining a steady pace throughout the race. This is the most efficient racing pace from a cardiovascular and muscle energy perspective. Erratic running speeds, particularly the urge to sprint early in a race while feeling fresh, consume energy inefficiently. A glance at the paceband and stopwatch as each distance marker is passed allows the athlete to quickly determine if they are running too fast for their targeted finishing time or too slowly and adjust accordingly.

Pre-printed versions for a variety of target finishing times can often be obtained before endurance races such as marathons, or commercially. Many websites exist that allow the free creation of customised pacebands for different distances and target finishing times that can be printed on the visitor's own computer.
