= Long-distance running =

Athletics event

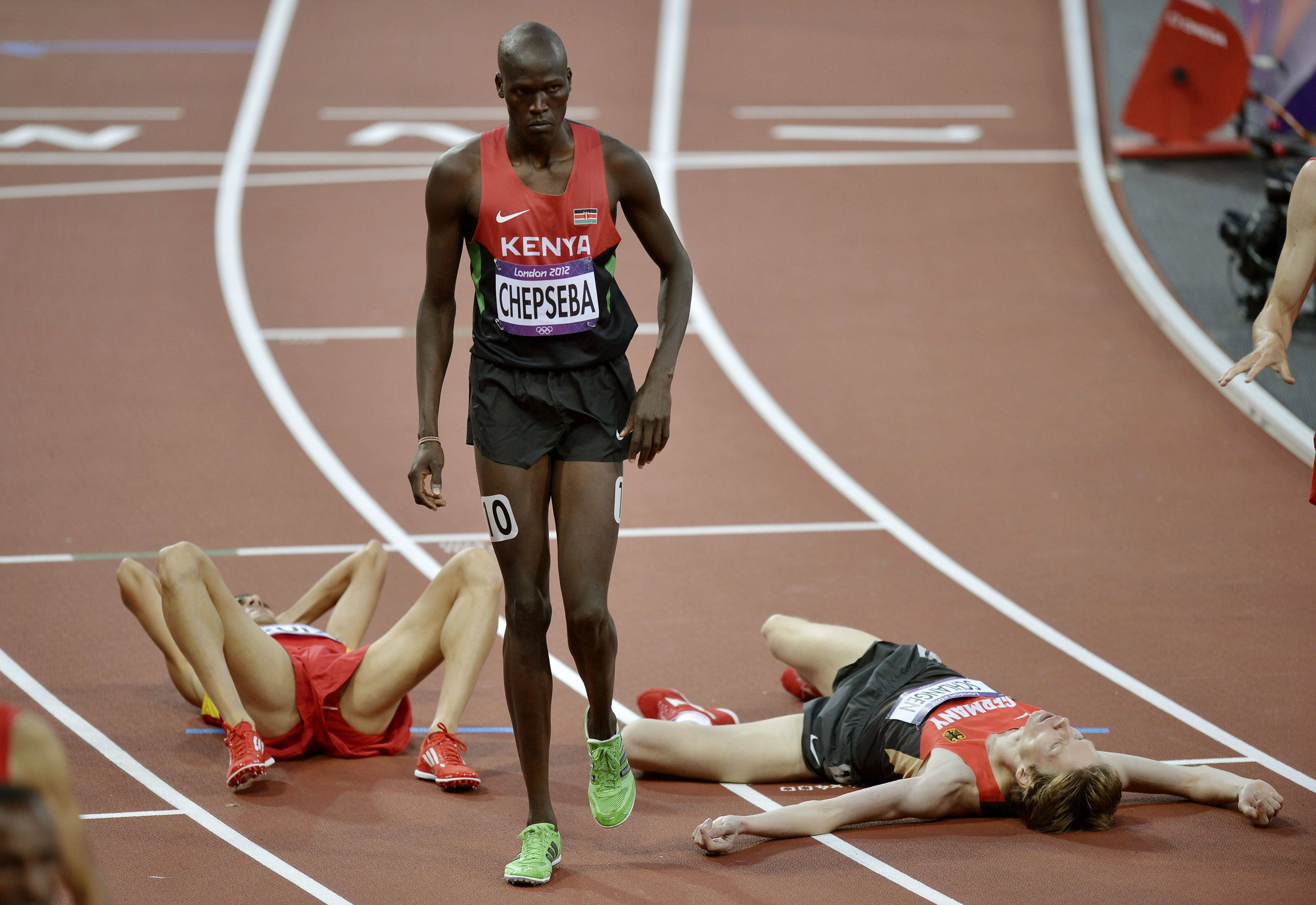
Nixon Kiplimo Chepseba (C) of Kenya steps over Diego Ruiz (L) of Spain and Carsten Schlangen of Germany after their round 1 men's 1500m heat during the London 2012 Olympics.

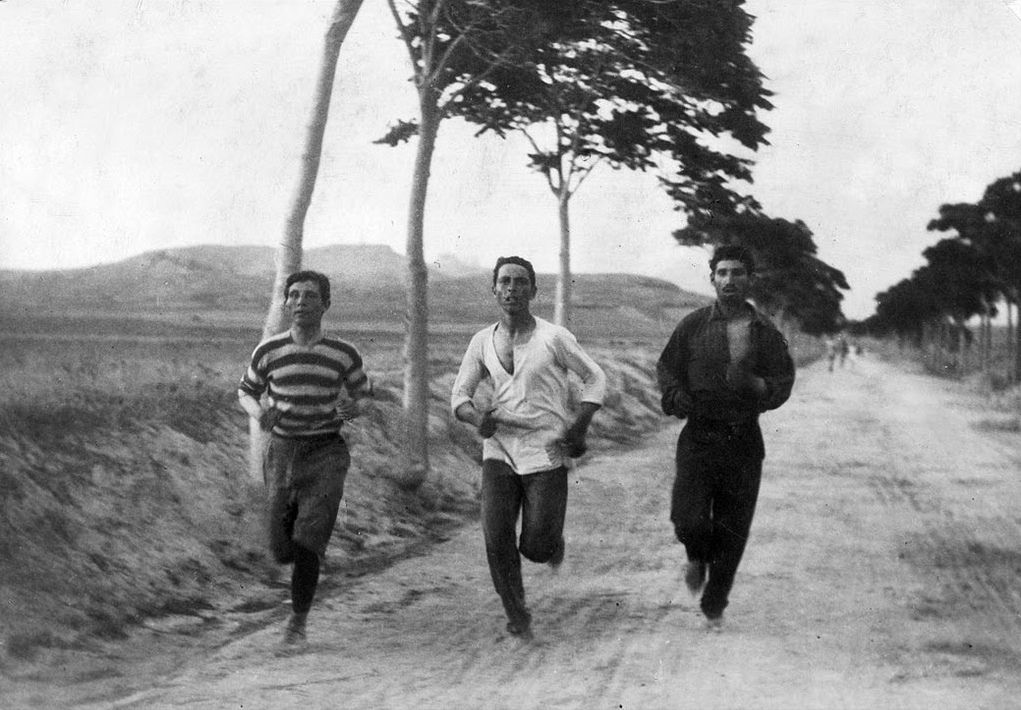
Burton Holmes' photograph entitled "1896: Three athletes in training for the marathon at the Olympic Games in Athens".

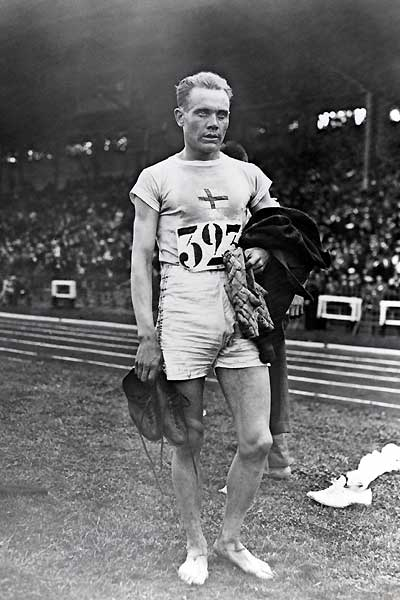
Paavo Nurmi, also known as the "Flying Finn", at the 1924 Summer Olympics in Paris; at the time, he won Olympic gold in the 5,000-meter long-distance running.

Long-distance running, or endurance running, is a form of continuous running over distances of at least 3 km (1.9 mi). Physiologically, it is essentially aerobic in nature and requires stamina as well as mental strength.

Within endurance running come two different types of respiration. Usually runners tend to experience aerobic respiration. This occurs when oxygen is present, and the body can utilize oxygen to help generate energy and muscle activity. Conversely, anaerobic respiration occurs when the body is deprived of oxygen. This is common towards the final stretch of races when there is a drive to speed up to a greater intensity. Overall, both types of respiration are used by endurance runners, however the two are very different from each other.

Among mammals, humans are well adapted for running significant distances, particularly so among primates. The capacity for endurance running is also found in migratory ungulates and a limited number of terrestrial carnivores, such as bears, dogs, wolves, and hyenas.

In modern human society, long-distance running has multiple purposes: people may engage in it for physical exercise, for recreation, as a means of travel, as a competitive sport, for economic reasons, or cultural reasons. Long-distance running can also be used as a means to improve cardiovascular health. In fact, endurance running is often a component of physical military training. Long-distance running as a form of tradition or ceremony is known among the Hopi and Tarahumara people, among others.

In the sport of athletics, long-distance events are defined as races covering 3 km (1.9 mi) and above. The three most common types are track running, road running, and cross country running, all of which are defined by their terrain – all-weather tracks, roads, and natural terrain, respectively.

Accessibility of long-distance running has helped it become a lasting trend of the 2020s. The ability for the sport to be completed alone allowed for it to gain popularity during the COVID-19 pandemic. This rise in popularity during a time of isolation gave people individual goals to focus on. After the pandemic, running became interconnected with a larger community, with the emergence of run clubs becoming more common. Today, marathon signups are at the highest they have been in decades, with more and more people taking up the sport to gain a sense of community and achieve physical health goals.

== History ==
=== Hunting ===
Modern hunter-gatherer communities have provided accounts for long-distance running as a historic method for hunting among the San of the Kalahari, American Indians, and Aboriginal Australians through anthropological observations. In this method, the hunter would run at a slow and steady pace for between one hour and a few days, in an area where the animal has no place to hide. As the animal runs in spurts, it will have to stop to pant and cool itself down. Although, as the chase goes on, it would not have enough time to rest, and would soon collapse again from heat and exhaustion. The skeletal structure of a 12-year-old Nariokatome boy has been suggested as proof that early humans from 1.5 million years ago ate more meat, consumed fewer plants, and hunted by running down animals.

=== Messengers ===
Long-distance running took on more and more purposes other than hunting, such as religious ceremonies, delivering messages for military and political purposes, and sport, thanks to new developments in agriculture and culture.

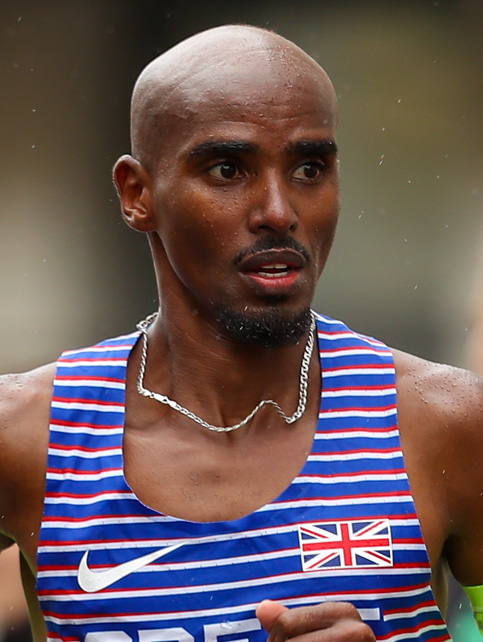
Mo Farah, a four-time Olympic and six-time World champion, holding the record for the most global Long-distance running gold medals.

Running messengers were supposedly from early Sumer. They were given the name lasimu, or military man, in addition to the king's officials who disseminated documents throughout the kingdom by running. Ancient Greece was famous for its running messengers, whom were named hemerodromoi, meaning "day runners". Pheidippides, one of the most famous running messengers according to the legend, ran from Marathon to Athens to announce the victory of the Greek over the Persians in the Battle of Marathon in 490 B.C. However, he collapsed and died as he delivered the message "we won". While there are debates around the accuracy of this historical legend, like whether Pheidippides ran from Marathon to Athens, between other cities, how far this was, or if he was the one to deliver the victory message, the marathon running event of 26.2 miles / 42.195 km is based on this tale.

=== Competition ===
Typically long-distance track races range from 3000 metres (1.87 miles) to 10,000 metres (6.2 miles), cross country races usually cover 5 to 12 km (3 to 7 1/2 miles), while road races can be significantly longer, reaching 100 km (62 mi) and beyond. In collegiate cross-country races in the United States, men race 8,000 or 10,000 meters, depending on their division, whereas women race 6,000 meters. The Summer Olympics features four long-distance running events: the 3000 metres steeplechase (which also involves jumping over barriers and water), the 5000 metres, 10,000 metres and marathon (42.195 kilometres, or 26 miles and 385 yards).

== Physiology ==
Humans have been considered among the best distance runners among all running animals: game animals are faster over short distances, but they have less endurance than humans. Unlike other primates whose bodies are suited to walk on four legs or climb trees, the human body has evolved into upright walking and running around 2–3 million years ago. The human body can endure long-distance running through the following attributes:

1. Bone and muscle structure: unlike quadruped mammals, which have their center of mass in front of the hind legs or limbs, in biped mammals, including humans, the center of mass lies right above the legs. This leads to different bone and muscular demands, especially in the legs and pelvis.
2. Dissipation of metabolic heat: humans' ability to cool the body by sweating through the body surface provides many advantages over panting through the mouth or nose. These include a larger surface of evaporation and independence of the respiratory cycle.
3. Increased tendon length: when compared to extant quadrupedal relatives, humans maintain longer, more spring-like tendons. This allows for more efficient locomotion over flat ground using the increased energy-storing capabilities of these tendon tissues.

One distinction between upright walking and running is energy consumption during locomotion. While walking, humans use about half the energy needed to run.

=== Factors ===
==== Aerobic capacity ====
One's aerobic capacity, or VO_{2}Max, is the ability to take up and consume oxygen during exhaustive exercise maximally. Long-distance runners typically perform at around 75–85% of peak aerobic capacity, while short-distance runners perform at closer to 100% of peak.

Aerobic capacity depends on the transportation of large amounts of blood to and from the lungs to reach all tissues. This, in turn, is dependent on having a high cardiac output, sufficient levels of hemoglobin in blood, and an optimal vascular system to distribute blood. A 20-fold increase of local blood flow within the skeletal muscle is necessary for endurance athletes, like marathon runners, to meet their muscles' oxygen demands at maximal exercise that are up to 50 times greater than at rest.

Elite long-distance runners often have larger hearts and decreased resting heart rates that enable them to achieve greater aerobic capacities. Increased dimensions of the heart enable an individual to achieve a greater stroke volume. A concomitant decrease in stroke volume occurs with the initial increase in heart rate at the onset of exercise. Despite an increase in cardiac dimensions, a marathoner's aerobic capacity is confined to this capped and ever-decreasing heart rate.

The amount of oxygen that blood can carry depends on blood volume, which increases during a race, and the amount of hemoglobin in the blood.

Other physiological factors affecting a marathon runner's aerobic capacity include pulmonary diffusion, mitochondrial enzyme activity, and capillary density.

A long-distance runner's running economy is their steady state requirement for oxygen at specific speeds and helps explain differences in performance for runners with very similar aerobic capacities. This is often measured by the volume of oxygen consumed, either in liters or milliliters, per kilogram of body weight per minute (L/kg/min or mL/kg/min). As of 2016 the physiological basis for this was uncertain, but it seemed to depend on the cumulative years of running and reaches a cap that longer individual training sessions cannot overcome.

==== Lactate threshold ====
A long-distance runner's velocity at the lactate threshold is strongly correlated to their performance. The lactate threshold is the crossover point between predominantly aerobic energy usage and anaerobic energy usage. It is considered a good indicator of the body's ability to efficiently process and transfer chemical energy into mechanical energy. For most runners, the aerobic zone does not begin until around 120 heartbeats per minute. Lactate threshold training involves tempo workouts that are meant to build strength and speed, rather than improve the cardiovascular system's efficiency in absorbing and transporting oxygen. By running at the lactate threshold, the body will become more efficient at clearing lactate and reusing it to fuel muscles. Uncertainty exists regarding how lactate threshold affects endurance performance.

==== Fuel ====
To sustain high-intensity running, a marathon runner must obtain sufficient glycogen stores. Glycogen can be found in the skeletal muscles and liver. With low levels of glycogen stores at the onset of the marathon, premature depletion of these stores can reduce performance or even prevent the completion of the race. ATP production via aerobic pathways can further be limited by glycogen depletion. Free Fatty Acids serve as a sparing mechanism for glycogen stores. The artificial elevation of these fatty acids, along with endurance training, demonstrates a marathon runner's ability to sustain higher intensities for longer periods of time. The prolonged sustenance of running intensity is attributed to a high turnover rate of fatty acids that allows the runner to preserve glycogen stores later into the race.

Long-distance runners generally practice carbohydrate loading in their training and race preparation.

==== Thermoregulation and body fluid loss ====
The maintenance of core body temperature is crucial to a marathon runner's performance and health. An inability to reduce rising core body temperature can lead to hyperthermia. The metabolically produced heat needs to be removed from the body via sweating in order to reduce body heat. In turn, this requires rehydration as compensation for the process. Replacement of fluid is limited, but it can help keep the body's internal temperature cooler. Fluid replacement is physiologically challenging during the exercise of this intensity due to the inefficient emptying of the stomach. Partial fluid replacement can serve to avoid a marathon runner's body overheating, but not enough to keep pace with the loss of fluid via sweat evaporation. Heat regulation is also immensely impacted by environmental factors.

==== Altitude ====
Since the late 1980s, Kenyans, Moroccans, and Ethiopians have dominated in major international long-distance competitions. The high altitude of these countries has been proven to help these runners achieve more success. High altitude, combined with endurance training, can lead to an increase in red blood cells, allowing increased oxygen delivery via the arteries. The majority of these East African successful runners come from three mountain districts that run along the Great Rift Valley. While altitude may be a contributing factor, a culture of hard work, teamwork, as well as an advanced institutional structure also contribute to their success.

=== Impact on health ===
"... an evolutionary perspective indicates that we did not evolve to run long distances at fast speeds on a regular basis. As a result, it is unlikely there was a selection for the human body to cope with some of the extreme demands runners place on their bodies."

The impact of long-distance running on human health is generally positive. Various organs and systems in the human body are improved: for example, bone mineral density is increased.

However, beyond a certain point, negative consequences might occur. Older male runners (45–55) who run more than 40 miles (64 kilometers) per week face reduced testosterone levels, although they are still in the normal range. Running a marathon lowers testosterone levels by 50% in men and more than doubles cortisol levels for 24 hours. Low testosterone is thought to be a physiological adaptation to the sport, as excess muscle caused may be shed through lower testosterone, yielding a more efficient runner. Veteran, lifelong endurance athletes have been found to have more heart scarring than control groups. Still, replication studies and larger studies should be done to firmly establish the link, which may or may not be causal. Some studies find that running more than 20 miles (32 kilometers) per week yields no lower risk for all-cause mortality than non-runners, although these studies are in conflict with extensive studies that show longer lifespans for any increase in exercise volume.

Elite-level long-distance running is associated with a three to seven times higher risk of the knee osteoarthritis later in life compared to non-runners. The effectiveness of shoe inserts has been contested. Memory foam and similar shoe inserts may be comfortable, but they can make foot muscles weaker in the long term. Running shoes with special features, or lack thereof in the case of minimalist designs, do not prevent injury. Rather, comfortable shoes and standard running styles are safer.

== In sport ==
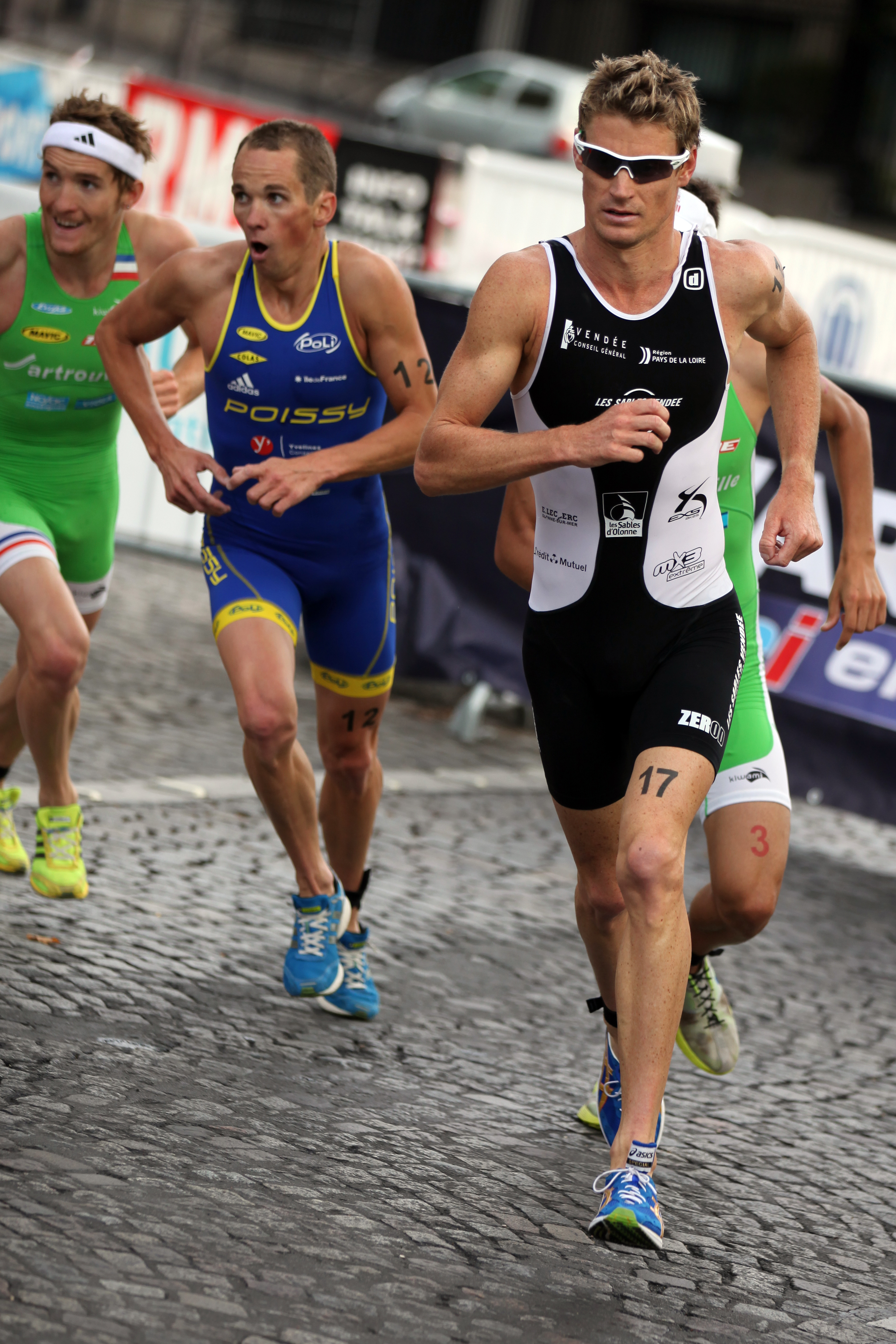
Men in the 10 km run section of the 2011 Grand Prix de Triathlon in Paris.

Many sporting activities feature significant levels of running under prolonged periods of play, especially during ball sports like association football and rugby league. However, continuous endurance running is exclusively found in racing sports. Most of these are individual sports, although team and relay forms also exist.

In the sport of athletics, long-distance events are defined as races covering 3 km (1.9 mi) and above. The three most common types are track running, road running, and cross country running, all of which are defined by their terrain – all-weather tracks, roads, and natural terrain, respectively. Other less popular variants, such as fell running, trail running, mountain running, and tower running, combine the challenge of distance with a significant incline or change of elevation as part of the course.

Multisport races frequently include endurance running. Triathlon, as defined by the International Triathlon Union, may feature running sections ranging from five kilometres (3.1 miles) to the marathon distance (42.195 kilometres, or 26 miles and 385 yards), depending on the race type. The related sport of duathlon is a combination of cycling and distance running. Previous versions of the modern pentathlon incorporated a three or four-kilometre (1.9–2.5 mi) run, but changes to the official rules in 2008 meant the running sections are now divided into three separate legs of one kilometre each (0.6 mi). Depending on the rules and terrain, navigation sports such as foot orienteering and rogaining may contain periods of endurance running within the competition. Variants of adventure racing may also combine navigational skills and endurance running in this manner.

=== Running competitions ===
==== Track running ====
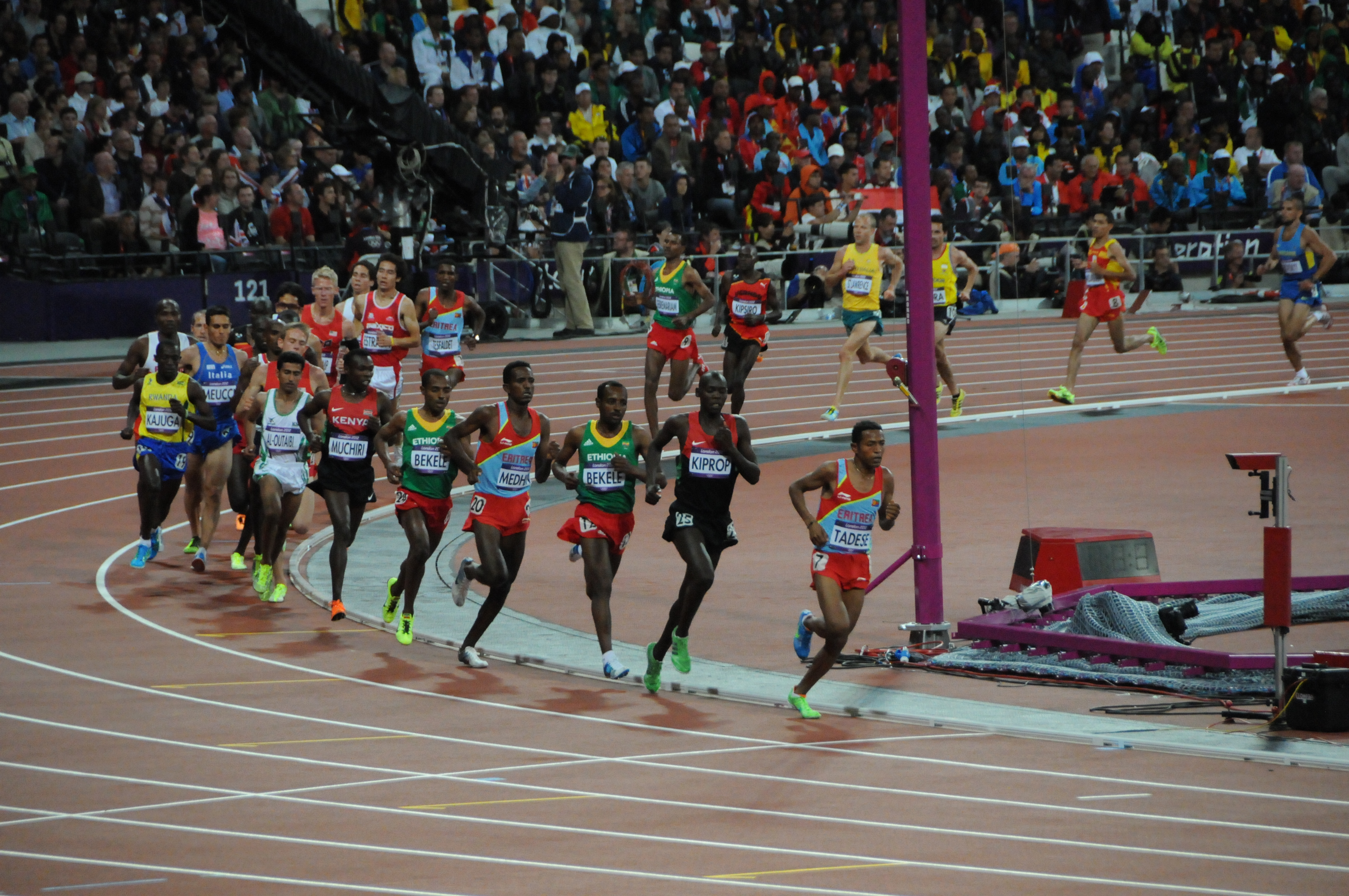
Runners turning the bend in the men's 10,000 metres final at the 2012 Summer Olympics.

The history of long-distance track running events is tied to the track and field stadia where they are held. Oval circuits allow athletes to cover long distances in a confined area. Early tracks were usually on flattened earth or were marked areas of grass. The style of running tracks became refined during the 20th century: the oval running tracks were standardised to 400 metres in distance and cinder tracks were replaced by synthetic all-weather running track of asphalt and rubber from the mid-1960s onwards. It was not until the 1912 Stockholm Olympics that the standard long-distance track events of 5000 metres and 10,000 metres were introduced.

- The 5000 metres is a premier event that requires tactics and superior aerobic conditioning. Training for such an event may consist of a total of 60–200 kilometers (37–124 miles) a week, although training regimens vary greatly. The 5000 is often a popular entry-level race for beginning runners.
  - The world record for men is 12:35.36 (an average of 23.83 km/h) by Joshua Cheptegei of Uganda in Monaco set on 14 August 2020.
  - The world record for women is 13:58.06 (an average of 21.48 km/h) by Beatrice Chebet of Kenya in Oregon, United States set on 5 July 2025.
- The 10,000 metres is the longest standard track event. Most of those running such races also compete in road races and cross country running events.
  - The world record for men is 26:11.00 (22.915 km/h) by Joshua Cheptegei of Uganda in Valencia, Spain set on 7 October 2020.
  - The world record for women is 29:01.03 by Letesenbet Gidey of Ethiopia in Hengelo, the Netherlands set on 8 June 2021.
- The 3000 metres steeplechase is a race that involves not only running but also jumping over barriers and a water pit. While it can be considered a hurdling event, it is widely regarded as a long-distance running event as well. The obstacles for the men are 914 millimetres (36.0 inches) high, and for the women 762 millimetres (30.0 inches).
  - The world record for men is 7:53.63 by Saif Saaeed Shaheen of Qatar in Brussels, Belgium set on 3 September 2004.
  - The world record for women is 8:44.32 by Beatrice Chepkoech of Kenya in Monaco, set on 20 July 2018.
- The One hour run is an endurance race that is rarely contested, except in pursuit of world records.
- The 20,000 metres is also rarely contested, most world records in this distance have been set while in a one-hour run race.
- The 25,000 metres and 30,000 metres were contested even more sporadically for world records, until 2020 when those distances (along with the 20,000 metres) were removed from the list of events for which world records are recognised.

==== Road running ====
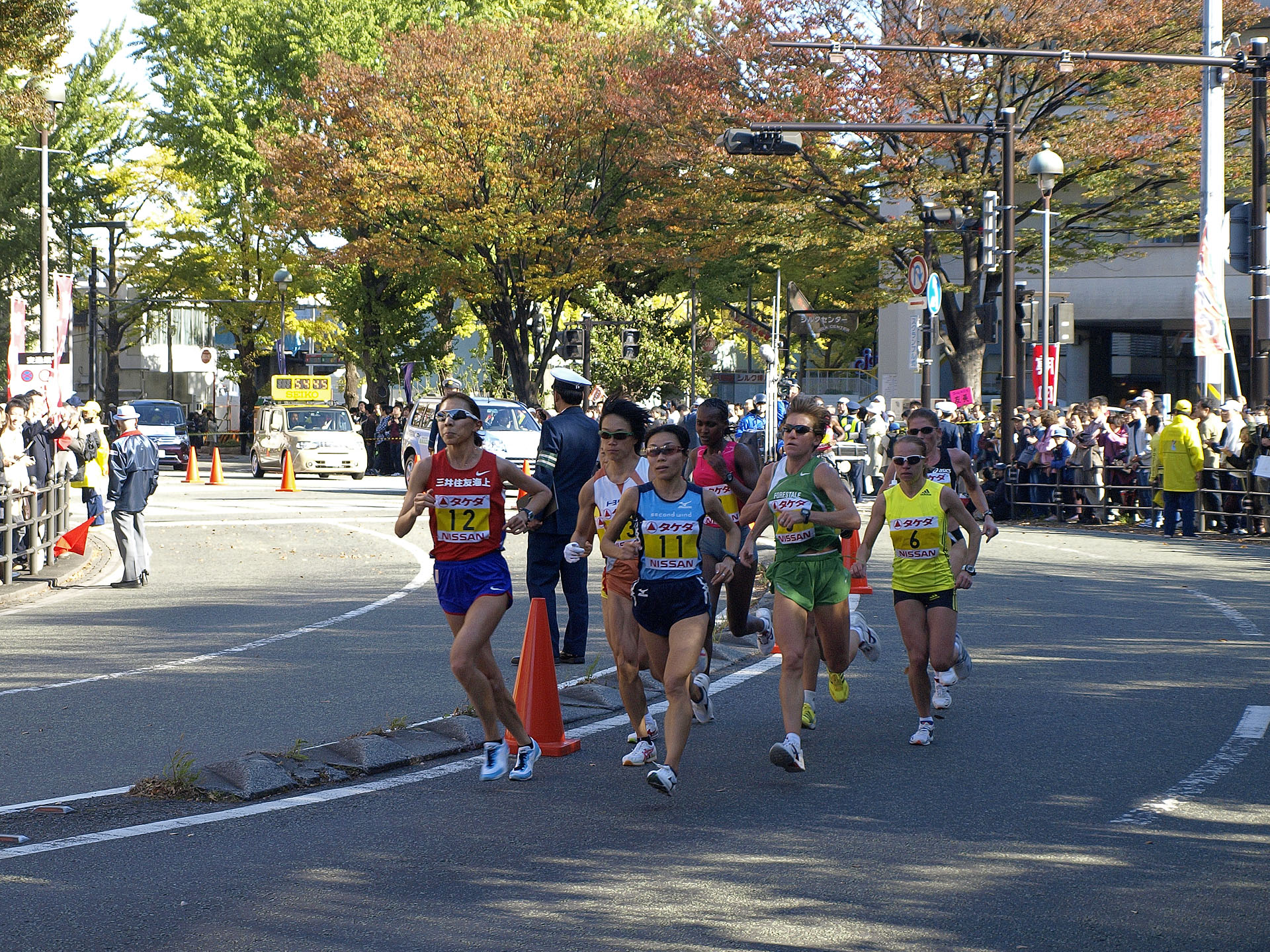
Women runners on a closed-off-road at the 2009 Yokohama Marathon.

Long-distance road running competitions are mainly conducted on courses of paved or tarmac roads. However, major events often finish on the track of a main stadium. In addition to being a common recreational sport, the elite level of the sport – particularly marathon races – is one of the most popular aspects of athletics. Road racing events can be of virtually any distance, but the most common and well-known are the marathon, half marathon, and 10 km run.

The sport of road running finds its roots in the activities of footmen: male servants who ran alongside the carriages of aristocrats around the 18th century, and who also ran errands over distances for their masters. Foot racing competitions evolved from wagers between aristocrats, who pitted their footmen against those of another aristocrat to determine a winner. The sport became professionalised as footmen were hired specifically on their athletic ability and began to devote their lives to training for gambling events. The amateur sports movement in the late 19th century marginalised competitions based on the professional, gambling model.

The 1896 Summer Olympics saw the birth of the modern marathon. The event led to the growth of road running competitions through annual public events such as the Boston Marathon (first held in 1897) and the Lake Biwa Marathon and Fukuoka Marathons, which were established in the 1940s. The marathon is the only road running event featured at the World Athletics Championships and the Summer Olympics. However, there is also the World Athletics Half Marathon Championships held every two years. The marathon is also the only road running event featured at the World Para Athletics Championships and the Summer Paralympics. The World Marathon Majors series includes the six most prestigious marathon competitions at the elite level – the Berlin, Boston, Chicago, London, Tokyo, and New York City marathons. The Tokyo Marathon was most recently added to the World Marathon Majors in 2012. Ekiden contests – which originated in Japan and remain common there – are a relay race variation on the marathon, in contrast to the typically individual sport of road running.

==== Cross country running ====
Cross-country running is thought of as the most naturalistic form of long-distance running in athletics as competitions take place on open-air courses over surfaces such as grass, woodland trails, earth, or mountains. In contrast to the relatively flat courses in track and road races, cross country usually incorporates obstacles such as muddy sections, logs, and mounds of earth. As a result of these factors, weather can play an integral role in racing conditions. Cross country is both an individual and team sport, as runners are judged on an individual basis and a points-scoring method is used for teams. Competitions are typically races of 4 km (2.5 mi) or more, which are usually held in autumn and winter. There are some cross-country athletes who choose to compete in long-distance track and road events as well.

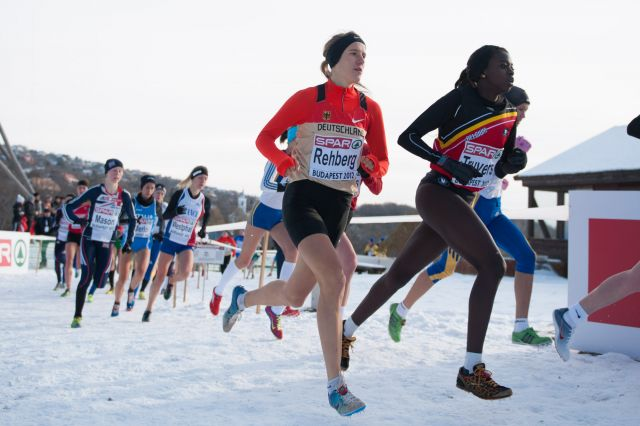
Women racing on snow in the 2012 European Cross Country Championships

The history of the sport is linked with the game of paper chase, or hare and hounds, where a group of runners would cover long distances to chase a leading runner, who left a trail of paper to follow. The Crick Run in England in 1838 was the first recorded instance of an organised cross-country competition. The sport gained popularity in British and then American schools in the 19th century and culminated in the creation of the first International Cross Country Championships in 1903. The annual World Athletics Cross Country Championships was inaugurated in 1973, and this remains the highest level of competition for the sport. Several continental cross country competitions are held, with championships taking place in Africa, Asia, Europe, Oceania, North America and South America.

The sport has retained its status at the scholastic level, particularly in the United Kingdom and the United States. At the professional level, the foremost competitions come under the banner of the World Athletics Cross Country Tour. While cross-country competitions are no longer held at the Olympics, having featured in the athletics programme from 1912 to 1924, it has been present as one of the events within the modern pentathlon competition since the 1912 Summer Olympics. Fell running, trail running, and mountain running can all be considered variations on the traditional cross country, which incorporate significant uphill and/or downhill sections as an additional challenge to the course.

== Adventure running ==
The term adventure running is loosely defined and can be used to describe any form of long-distance running in a natural setting, regardless of the running surface. It may include river crossing, scrambling, snow, extremely high or low temperatures, and high altitudes. It has both competitive and non-competitive forms, the latter being for individual recreation or social experience. As a result, courses are often set in scenic locations and feature obstacles designed to give participants a sense of achievement. It bears similarities to running sections of adventure racing.

== Ultra-long distance: extended events and achievements ==
Several events, records, and achievements exist for long-distance running outside the context of track and field sports events. These include multiday races, ultramarathons, and long-distance races in extreme conditions or measuring hundreds or thousands of miles. Beyond these, records and stand-alone achievements, rather than regular events, exist for individuals who have achieved running goals of a unique nature, such as running across or around continents (see lists of runners: America, Australia) or running around the world.

== Effects of super shoes ==
Since 2016, carbon-plated shoes have affected elite record results. Shoes containing a rigid carbon plate (super shoes) have led runners to performance benefits of 5%, with some shoes returning up to 85% of energy previously lost at the beginning of a stride. Super shoes have allowed athletes to record ever-increasing elite performances. One notable performance occurring in 2019 was Eliud Kipchoges sub-2-hour marathon attempt. Wearing specially developed Nike Alphafly shoes, Kipchoge would run a 1:59:40 marathon, breaking the world record with an unofficial clocking.

Record-breaking performances have become more common within long-distance running, with athletes able to get the most out of the technology available and current knowledge regarding training adaptations. Record improvements have increased since 2016, with some questioning performances and the possible effects of technological doping. With long-distance running improvements at the elite level resulting from marginal gains and super shoes introducing around a 5% increase in performance and increased running economy over a long distance, percentage increases in performance can be felt and seen. Performances were called into question, and in 2021, World Athletics determined stricter regulations for shoes used in competition, with a limit of 20mm in stack height. Super shoes have had a significant impact on long-distance running, with elite runners able to get closer to world records never thought to be achievable, and amateur runners able to get closer to their own long-distance personal records while using super shoes.

== See also ==
- Fastpacking
- Middle-distance running
- Neurobiological effects of physical exercise
- Paceband
- Rarámuri people
- Running economy
- VO_{2}max

== Notes and references ==
- "Aerobic vs. Anaerobic Training". Runners Connect. 28 January 2010.
