= Venous blood =

Deoxygenated blood

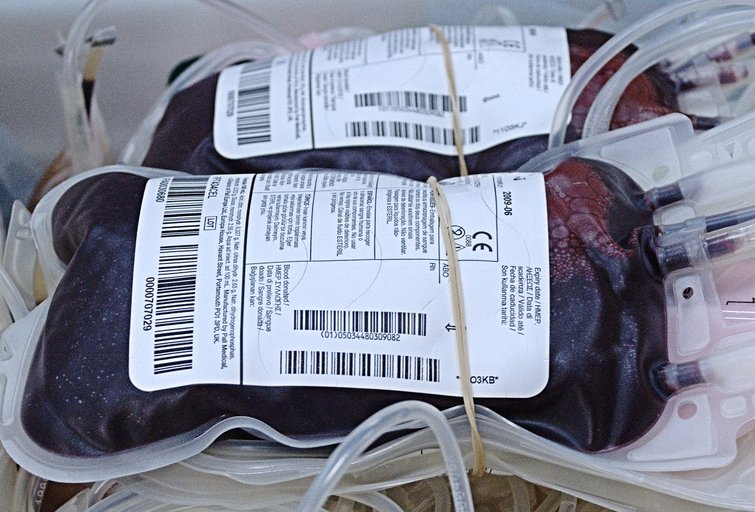
Concentrated blood after oxygenation

Venous blood is deoxygenated blood which travels from the peripheral blood vessels, through the venous system into the right atrium of the heart. Deoxygenated blood is then pumped by the right ventricle to the lungs via the pulmonary artery which is divided in two branches, left and right to the left and right lungs respectively. Blood is oxygenated in the lungs and returns to the left atrium through the pulmonary veins.

Venous blood is typically colder than arterial blood, and has a lower oxygen content and pH. It also has lower concentrations of glucose and other nutrients and has higher concentrations of urea and other waste products. The difference in the oxygen content of arterial blood and venous blood is known as the arteriovenous oxygen difference.

Most medical laboratory tests are conducted on venous blood, with the exception of arterial blood gas tests. Venous blood is obtained for lab work by venipuncture (also called phlebotomy), or by finger prick for small quantities.

== Color ==
The color of human blood ranges from bright red when oxygenated to a darker red when deoxygenated. It owes its color to hemoglobin, to which oxygen binds. Deoxygenated blood is darker due to the difference in shape of the red blood cell when oxygen binds to haemoglobin in the blood cell (oxygenated) versus does not bind to it (deoxygenated). Though veins might make it appear as such, human blood is never naturally blue.

The blue appearance of surface veins is caused mostly by the scattering of blue light away from the outside of venous tissue if the vein is at 0.5 mm deep or more. Veins and arteries appear similar when skin is removed and are seen directly.
