= Lactate 2-monooxygenase =

Identifiers
- EC no.: 1.13.12.4
- CAS no.: 9028-72-2

Databases
- BRENDA: enzyme data
- ExPASy: NiceZyme view
- KEGG: enzyme entry
- MetaCyc: metabolic pathway
- Rhea: reactions
- PDB structures: RCSB PDB PDBe PDBsum
- Gene Ontology: AmiGO / QuickGO
Search
- PMC: articles
- PubMed: articles
- NCBI: proteins

Lactate 2-monooxygenase (EC 1.13.12.4) is an enzyme that catalyzes the chemical reaction

L-lactic acid
O_{2}
H_{2}O
acetic acid
+ CO_{2}

The two substrates of this enzyme are L-lactic acid and oxygen. Its products are acetic acid, carbon dioxide, and water.

This enzyme belongs to the family of oxidoreductases, specifically those acting on single donors with O_{2} as oxidant and incorporation of two atoms of oxygen into the substrate (oxygenases). The oxygen incorporated need not be derived from O with incorporation of one atom of oxygen (internal monooxygenases o internal mixed-function oxidases). The systematic name of this enzyme class is (S)-lactate:oxygen 2-oxidoreductase (decarboxylating). Other names in common use include lactate oxidative decarboxylase, lactate oxidase, lactic oxygenase, lactate oxygenase, lactic oxidase, L-lactate monooxygenase, lactate monooxygenase, and L-lactate-2-monooxygenase. This enzyme participates in pyruvate metabolism. It employs one cofactor, flavin mononucleotide.

== Structural studies ==
As of late 2007, only one structure has been solved for this class of enzymes, with the PDB accession code PDB: 2DU2.
