= Arterial blood =

Blood in an artery

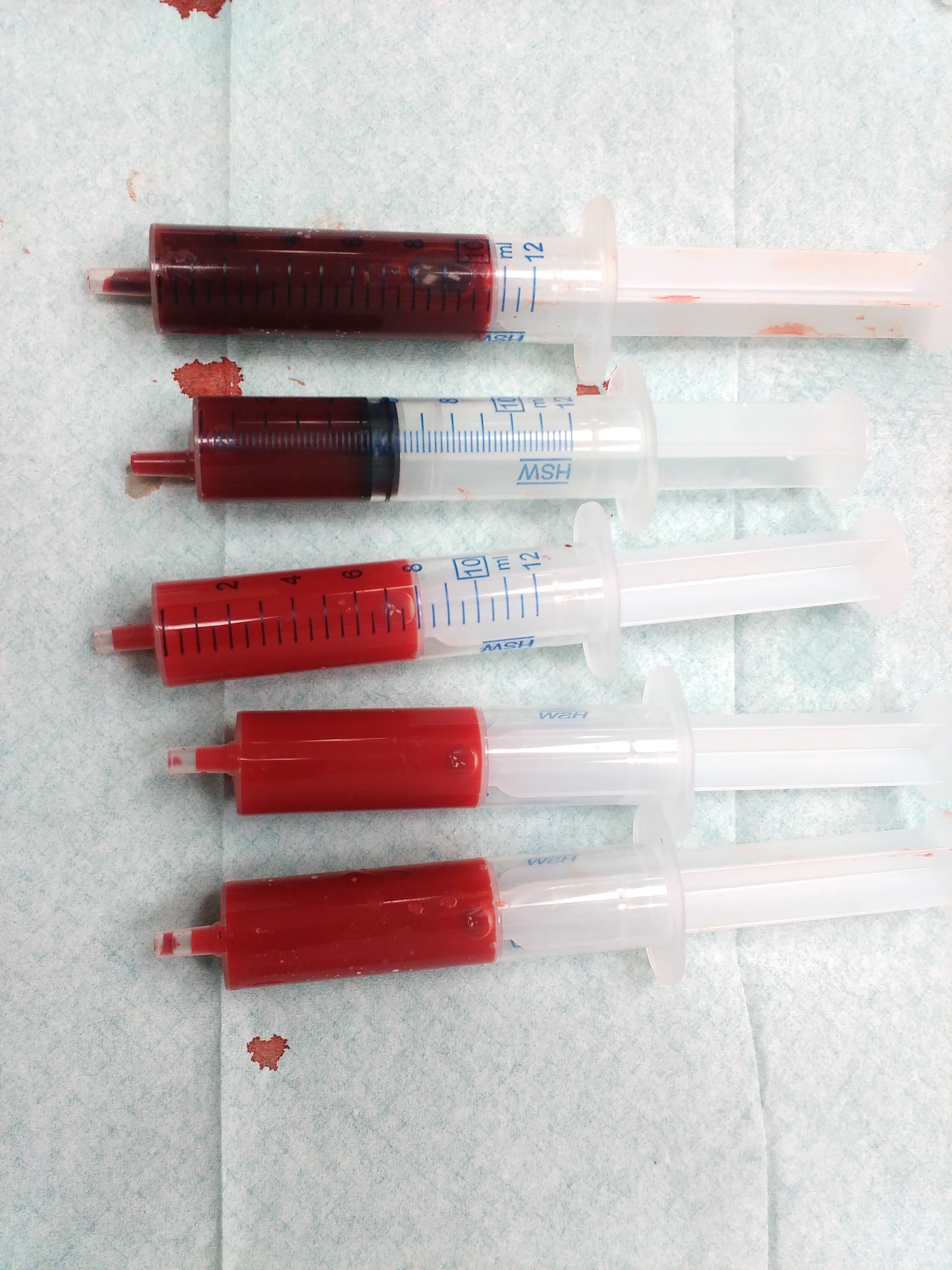
Top two vials are venous blood, and the bottom three are arterial blood

Arterial blood is the oxygenated blood in the circulatory system found in the pulmonary vein, the left chambers of the heart, and in the arteries. It is bright red in color, while venous blood is dark red in color (but looks purple through the translucent skin). It is the contralateral term to venous blood.

Framed in the cardiac cycle, often historically accredited to the Wiggers diagram, arterial blood has just passed through the lungs and is ready to boost oxygen to sustain the peripheral organs. The essential difference between venous and arterial blood is the curve of the oxygen saturation of haemoglobin. The difference in the oxygen content of the blood between the arterial blood and the venous blood is known as the arteriovenous oxygen difference.

== See also ==
- Acidosis
- Alkalosis
- Arterial blood gas
- Chemical equilibrium
- Oxygen saturation
- pH
- pKa
