= Cardiorespiratory fitness =

Medical term

Cardiorespiratory fitness (CRF) refers to the ability of the circulatory and respiratory systems to supply oxygen to skeletal muscles during sustained physical activity. The history of CRF began with its establishment in the 1920s, followed by decades of ongoing research and development. Scientists and researchers use CRF to assess the functional capacity of the respiratory and cardiovascular systems. These functions include ventilation, perfusion, gas exchange, vasodilation, and delivery of oxygen to the body's tissues. Cardiac output also provides evidence of the body adapting to demands and physical exertion that it faces. As these body functions are vital to an individual's health, CRF allows observers to quantify an individual's morbidity and mortality risk as a function of cardiorespiratory health, measuring it using varying methods. Regular physical activity and exercise can improve CRF, thus decreasing risk of CVD and other conditions while improving overall health.

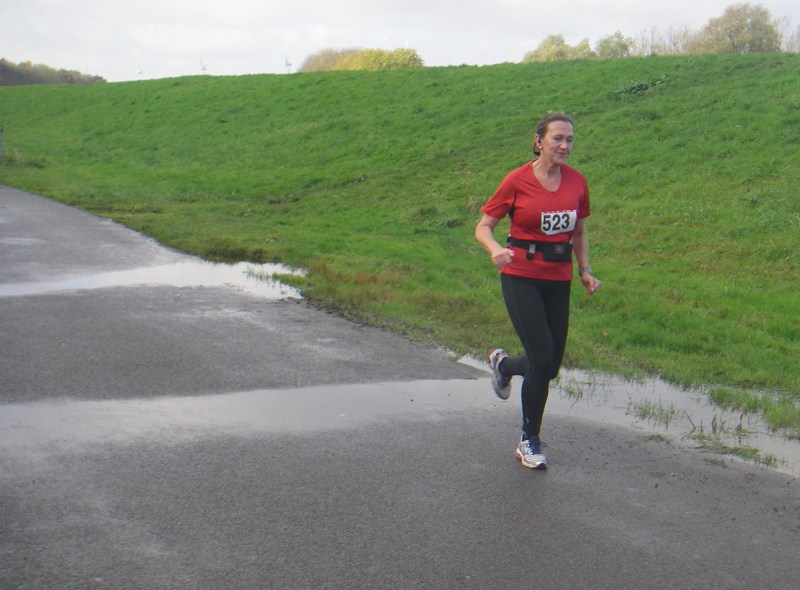
A woman running outside. This exercise is a form of cardio that increases cardiorespiratory fitness.

In 2016, the American Heart Association published an official scientific statement advocating that CRF, quantifiable as V̇O_{2} max/peak, be categorized as a clinical vital sign and should be routinely assessed as part of clinical practice. Low levels of CRF have been shown to increase the risk of cardiovascular disease (CVD) and all-cause mortality. Some medical researchers claim that CRF is an even stronger predictor of mortality than smoking, hypertension, high cholesterol, type 2 diabetes mellitus, or other common risk factors. Tracking these mortality levels also provides socioeconomic differences in CRF that may lead to increased disease risk.

== History and etymology ==
The emergence of a method to quantify CRF began in the 1920s when Archibald Hill, a British physiologist, proposed a multifactorial relationship between the maximum rate of oxygen uptake by body tissues and intensity of physical activity. This measure was found to be dependent upon functional capacities of an individual's cardiovascular and respiratory systems. He coined the term VO_{2} max, or maximal oxygen consumption, the numerical result of exercise testing that represents the maximum rate of oxygen consumed per kilogram of body mass per minute during exercise which now serves as the primary measure of CRF. This proposal ignited a multitude of studies demonstrating a relationship between VO_{2} max and cardiovascular disease and all-cause mortality.

In 2016, the American Heart Association published an official scientific statement advocating that CRF be categorized as a clinical vital sign and should be routinely assessed as part of clinical practice.

The prefix "cardio-" refers to the heart while "-respiratory" links the heart and respiratory system, which includes organs that contribute to gas exchange in plants and animals, especially the lungs (animals). Fitness refers to an individual's state of health.

== Exercise ==
Cardiorespiratory fitness can be increased by means of regular physical activity and exercise. The medical community agrees that regular physical activity plays an important role in reducing risk of cardiovascular disease, stroke, hypertension, diabetes, and a variety of other morbid conditions. A 2005 Cochrane review demonstrated that physical activity interventions are effective for increasing CRF, while other studies have determined that improved CRF is associated with lower risk of CVD and all-cause mortality.

Multiple forms of exercise exist and are all generally beneficial to an individual's health (endurance running, weightlifting, sports activity, etc.), but studies show that high intensity interval training (HIIT) is highly effective in increasing CRF and VO_{2} max in people of all ages. A 2020 review of the literature by Wu et al. concluded that HIIT is effective in increasing CRF, physical fitness, muscle power, cardiac contractile function, and reducing blood triglycerides in older individuals.

== Measurement ==
A method of estimating CRF entails using formulas, derived from extrapolated regressive analyses, to predict a theoretical level of CRF. These formulas take into consideration an individual's age, sex, BMI, substance use, relative levels of physical activity, and pathologic co-morbidites. In 2016, Nauman and Nes et al. demonstrated the added and unique utility of estimated cardiorespiratory fitness (eCRF) in predicting risk of cardiovascular disease and all-cause mortality.

Various methods of measurement exist for determining an individual's cardiorespiratory fitness. VO_{2} max is the most commonly accepted indicator of CRF and has been since the 1960s. Cardiopulmonary exercise testing (CPET) with spirometry is the gold standard for determining VO_{2} max. It requires the individual to perform exercise with analysis of gas exchange usually until maximal exertion is achieved. The use of electrocardiography is often used to examine heart response to exercise and exertion. CPET is performed on a treadmill or a cycle ergometer. The method of test administration is based on the abilities of the test subject, as the cycle ergometer is generally less taxing on the body and often better suited for elderly populations, although is shown to sometimes produce results 10% - 20% lower in individuals not accustomed to cycling due to leg fatigue.

In many cases, children or the elderly are not subjected to the vigor of cardiopulmonary exercise testing. There are other methods used to mathematically estimate the VO_{2} max of a test subject by having the subject walk or jog a certain distance in as little time as possible, complete the maximum number of repetitions of a short-distance run (commonly known as the PACER test in the United States), or walk on a treadmill at increasing incline until a sub-maximal goal is achieved, along with others.

== Cardiovascular system adaptations ==
The cardiovascular system responds to changing demands on the body by adjusting cardiac output, blood flow, and blood pressure. Cardiac output is defined as the product of heart rate and stroke volume which represents the volume of blood being pumped by the heart each minute. Cardiac output increases during physical activity due to an increase in both the heart rate and stroke volume.

== See also ==
- Aerobic conditioning
- Central governor
- Physical fitness
- Exercise physiology
- VO_{2} max
