= VO2 max =

Maximum rate of oxygen consumption as measured during incremental exercise

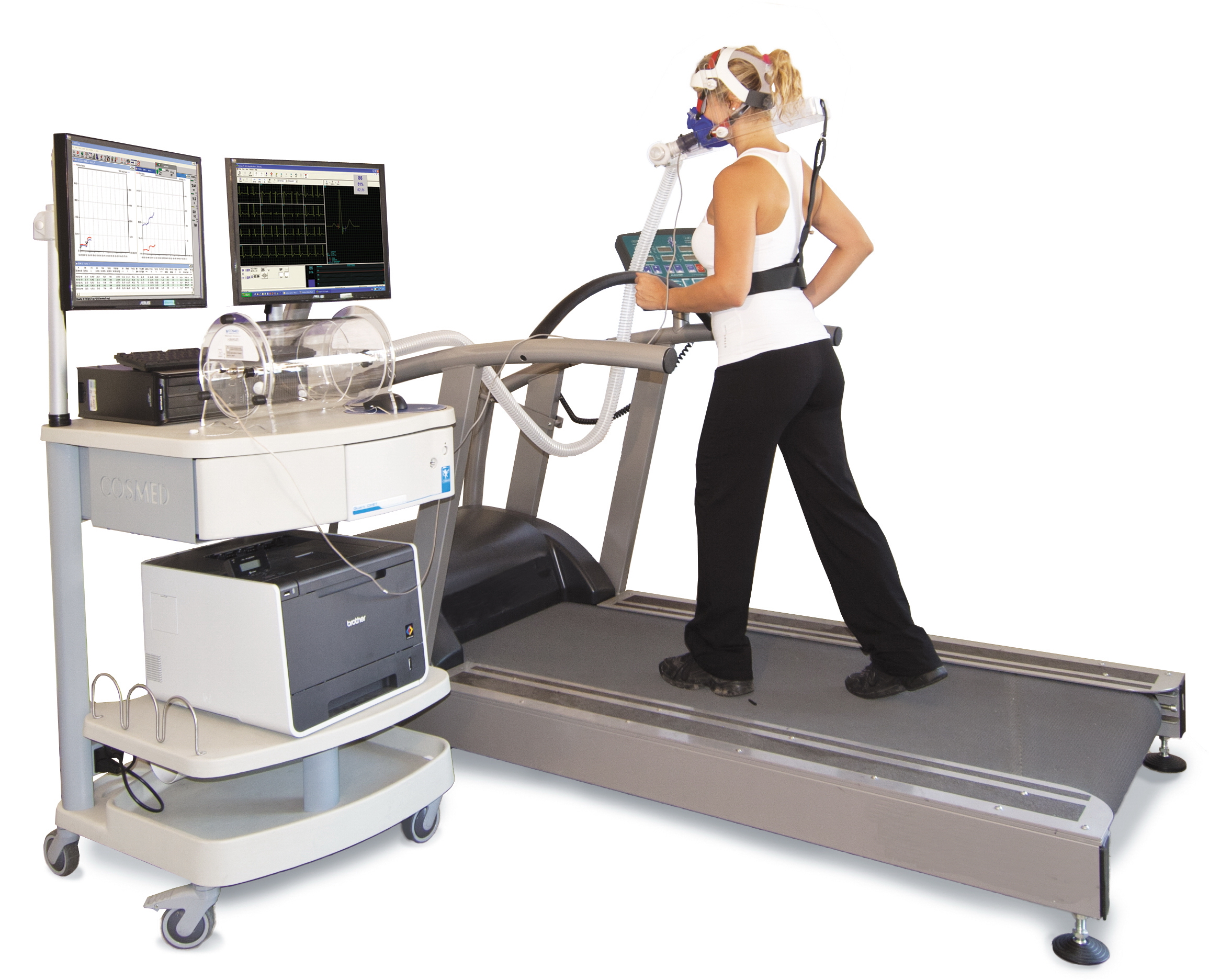
VO_{2} max measurement using instruments on a metabolic cart during a graded treadmill exercise test

V̇O_{2} max (also maximal oxygen consumption, maximal oxygen uptake or maximal aerobic capacity) is the maximum rate of oxygen consumption attainable during physical exertion. The name is derived from three abbreviations: "V̇" for volume (the dot over the V indicates "per unit of time" in Newton's notation), "O_{2}" for oxygen, and "max" for maximum and usually normalized per kilogram of body mass. A similar measure is V̇O_{2} peak (peak oxygen consumption), which is the highest rate attained during a session of submaximal physical exercise. It is equal to, or less than, the V̇O_{2} max. Confusion between these quantities in older and popular fitness literature is common. The capacity of the lung to exchange oxygen and carbon dioxide is constrained by the rate of blood oxygen transport to active tissue.

The measurement of V̇O_{2} max in the laboratory provides a quantitative value of endurance fitness for comparison of individual training effects and between people in endurance training. Maximal oxygen consumption reflects cardiorespiratory fitness and endurance capacity in exercise performance. Elite athletes, such as competitive distance runners, racing cyclists or Olympic cross-country skiers, can achieve V̇O_{2} max values exceeding 90 mL/(kg·min), while some endurance animals, such as Alaskan huskies, have V̇O_{2} max values exceeding 200 mL/(kg·min).

In physical training, especially in its academic literature, V̇O_{2} max is often used as a reference level to quantify exertion levels, such as 65% V̇O_{2} max as a threshold for sustainable exercise, which is generally regarded as more rigorous than heart rate, but is more elaborate to measure.

== Normalization per body mass ==
V̇O_{2} max is expressed either as an absolute rate in (for example) litres of oxygen per minute (L/min) or as a relative rate in (for example) millilitres of oxygen per kilogram of the body mass per minute (e.g., mL/(kg·min)). The latter expression is often used to compare the performance of endurance sports athletes. However, V̇O_{2} max generally does not vary linearly with body mass, either among individuals within a species or among species, so comparisons of the performance capacities of individuals or species that differ in body size must be done with appropriate statistical procedures, such as analysis of covariance.

== Measurement ==
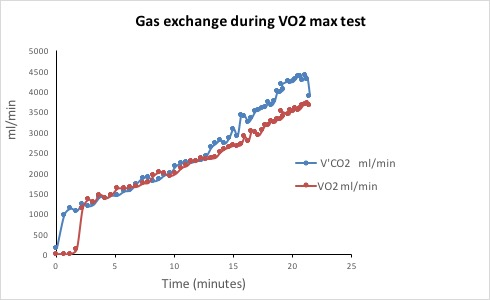
Gas exchange of VO_{2} and VCO_{2} during max test. Begin for 3 minutes at 60 watts and add 35 watts every 3 mins until exhaustion.

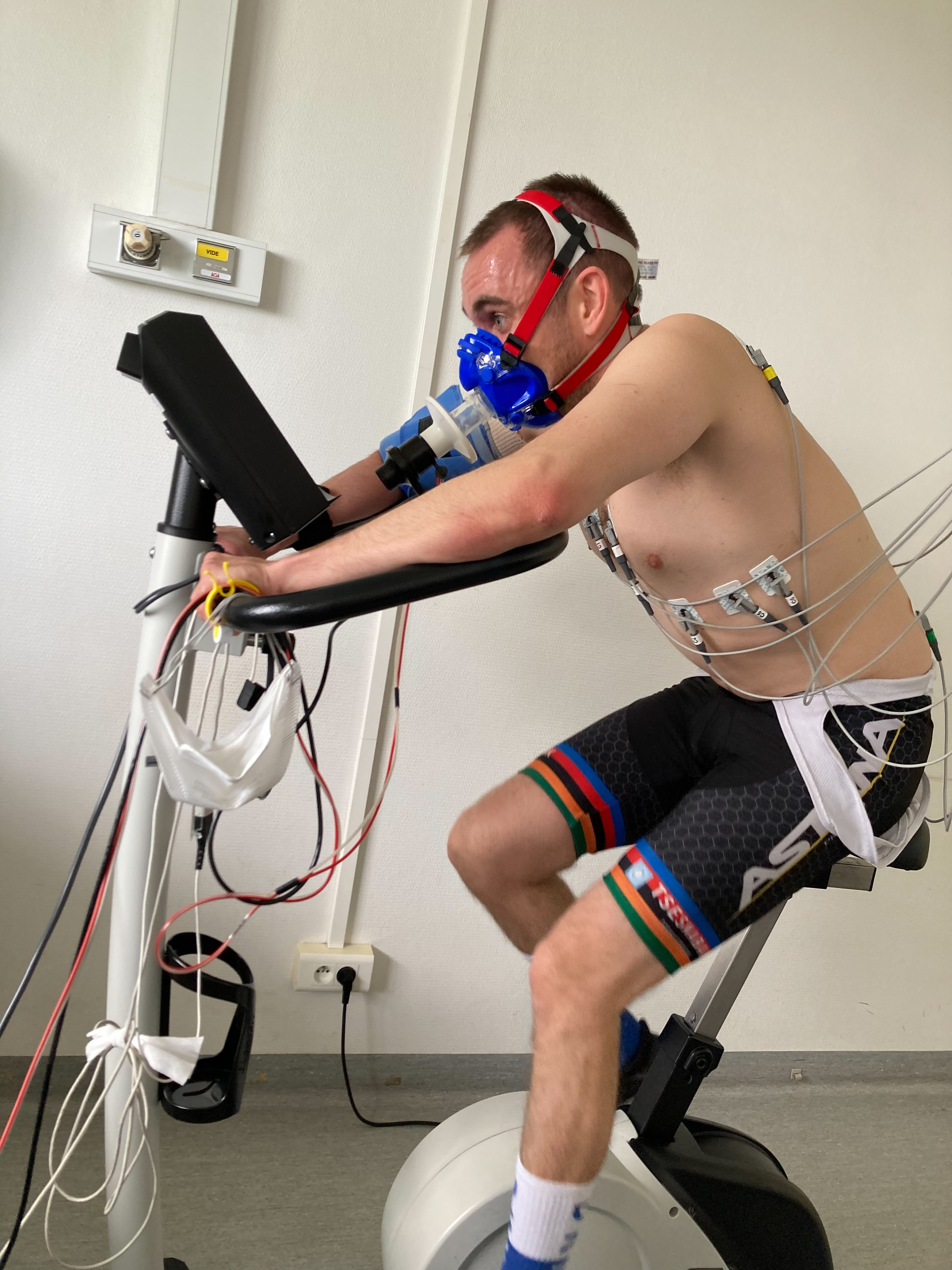
A VO_{2} max test

Accurately measuring V̇O_{2} max involves a physical effort sufficient in duration and intensity to fully tax the aerobic energy system. In general clinical and athletic testing, this usually involves a graded exercise test in which exercise intensity is progressively increased while measuring:

- ventilation and
- oxygen and carbon dioxide concentration of the inhaled and exhaled air.

V̇O_{2} max is measured during a cardiopulmonary exercise test (CPX test). The test is done on a treadmill or cycle ergometer. In untrained subjects, V̇O_{2} max is 10% to 20% lower when using a cycle ergometer compared with a treadmill. However, trained cyclists' results on the cycle ergometer are equal to or even higher than those obtained on the treadmill.

The classic V̇O_{2} max, in the sense of Hill and Lupton (1923), is reached when oxygen consumption remains at a steady state ("plateau") despite an increase in workload. The occurrence of a plateau is not guaranteed and may vary by person and sampling interval, leading to modified protocols with varied results.

=== Fick equation ===
V̇O_{2} may also be calculated by the Fick equation: $\ce{\dot VO2} = Q \times\ (C_a\ce{O2} - C_v\ce{O2})$, when these values are obtained during exertion at a maximal effort. Here Q is the cardiac output of the heart, C_{a}O_{2} is the arterial oxygen content, and C_{v}O_{2} is the venous oxygen content. (C_{a}O_{2} – C_{v}O_{2}) is also known as the arteriovenous oxygen difference.

The Fick equation may be used to measure V̇O_{2} in critically ill patients, but its usefulness is low even in non-exerted cases. Using a breath-based VO_{2} to estimate cardiac output, on the other hand, seems to be reliable enough.

== Estimation using submaximal exercise testing ==
The necessity for a subject to exert maximum effort in order to accurately measure V̇O_{2} max can be dangerous in those with compromised respiratory or cardiovascular systems; thus, sub-maximal tests for estimating V̇O_{2} max have been developed.

=== The heart rate ratio method ===
An estimate of V̇O_{2} max is based on maximum and resting heart rates. In the Uth et al. (2004) formulation, it is given by:

$$\ce{\dot VO2}\max \approx \frac{\text{HR}_\max}{\text{HR}_\text{rest}} \times 15.3\text{ mL}/(\text{kg}\cdot\text{minute})$$

This equation uses the ratio of maximum heart rate (HR_{max}) to resting heart rate (HR_{rest}) to predict V̇O_{2} max. The researchers cautioned that the conversion rule was based on measurements on well-trained men aged 21 to 51 only, and may not be reliable when applied to other sub-groups. They also advised that the formula is most reliable when based on actual measurement of maximum heart rate, rather than an age-related estimate.

The Uth constant factor of 15.3 is given for well-trained men. Later studies have revised the constant factor for different populations. According to Voutilainen et al. 2020, the constant factor should be 14 in around 40-year-old normal weight never-smoking men with no cardiovascular diseases, bronchial asthma, or cancer. Every 10 years of age reduces the coefficient by one, as well as does the change in body weight from normal weight to obese or the change from never-smoker to smoker. Consequently, V̇O_{2} max of 60-year-old obese smoking men should be estimated by multiplying the HR_{max} to HR_{rest} ratio by 10.

=== Cooper test ===
Kenneth H. Cooper conducted a study for the United States Air Force in the late 1960s. One of the results of this was the Cooper test in which the distance covered running in 12 minutes is measured. Based on the measured distance, an estimate of V̇O_{2} max [in mL/(kg·min)] can be calculated by inverting the linear regression equation, giving us:

$$\ce{\dot VO2}\max \approx {d_{12} - 504.9 \over 44.73}$$

where d_{12} is the distance (in metres) covered in 12 minutes.

An alternative equation is:

$$\ce{\dot VO2}\max \approx {(35.97 * d'_{12}) - 11.29}$$

where d′_{12} is distance (in miles) covered in 12 minutes.

=== Multi-stage fitness test ===
There are several other reliable tests and V̇O_{2} max calculators to estimate V̇O_{2} max, most notably the multi-stage fitness test (or beep test).

=== Rockport fitness walking test ===
Estimation of V̇O_{2} max from a timed one-mile track walk (as fast as possible) in decimal minutes (t, e.g.: 20:35 would be specified as 20.58), sex, age in years, body weight in pounds (BW, lbs), and 60-second heart rate in beats-per-minute (HR, bpm) at the end of the mile. The constant x is 6.3150 for males, 0 for females.

$$\ce{\dot VO2}\max \approx 132.853 -0.0769\cdot\text{BW} -0.3877\cdot\text{age} -3.2649t -0.1565\cdot\text{HR} +x$$

Correlation coefficient r for the generalized formula is 0.88.

== Reference values ==
Men have a V̇O_{2} max that is 26% higher (6.6 mL/(kg·min)) than women for treadmill and 37.9% higher (7.6 mL/(kg·min)) than women for cycle ergometer on average. V̇O_{2} max is on average 22% higher (4.5 mL/(kg·min)) when measured using a treadmill compared with a cycle ergometer.

V̇O_{2} percentiles by age group for treadmill and cycle ergometer cardiopulmonary exercise, in mL/(kg·min)
Percentile	Age group, in years													
Percentile	Men							Women						
Percentile	20–29	30–39	40–49	50–59	60–69	70–79	80–89	20–29	30–39	40–49	50–59	60–69	70–79	80–89
Treadmill
90	58.6	55.5	50.8	43.4	37.1	29.4	22.8	49.0	42.1	37.8	32.4	27.3	22.8	20.8
80	54.5	50.0	45.2	38.3	32.0	25.9	21.4	44.8	37.0	33.0	28.4	24.3	20.8	18.4
70	51.9	46.4	40.9	34.3	28.7	23.8	20.0	41.8	33.6	30.0	26.3	22.4	19.6	17.3
60	49.0	43.4	37.9	31.8	26.5	22.2	18.4	39.0	31.0	27.7	24.6	20.9	18.3	16.0
50	46.5	39.7	35.3	29.2	24.6	20.6	17.6	36.6	28.3	25.7	22.9	19.6	17.2	15.4
40	43.6	37.0	32.4	26.9	22.8	19.1	16.6	34.0	26.4	23.9	21.5	18.3	16.2	14.7
30	40.0	33.5	29.7	24.5	20.7	17.3	16.1	30.8	24.2	21.8	20.1	17.0	15.2	13.7
20	35.2	29.8	26.7	22.2	18.5	15.9	14.8	27.2	21.9	19.7	18.5	15.4	14.0	12.6
10	28.6	24.9	22.1	18.6	15.8	13.6	12.9	22.5	18.6	17.2	16.5	13.4	12.3	11.4
Cycle ergometer
90	62.2	50.5	41.9	37.1	31.4	26.2	18.7	46.0	32.0	27.3	22.4	20.3	18.0	18.1
80	57.0	39.0	35.1	31.6	27.0	22.6	17.3	40.9	27.0	23.5	20.4	18.5	16.8	14.3
70	52.8	35.5	31.4	28.4	24.5	20.6	16.2	37.5	24.5	21.8	18.9	17.4	15.9	12.9
60	48.3	31.6	29.0	26.3	23.3	19.4	14.6	34.3	22.9	20.3	17.8	16.4	15.0	11.3
50	44.0	30.2	27.4	24.5	21.7	18.3	13.2	31.6	21.6	18.8	16.9	15.7	14.5	10.9
40	40.8	27.9	25.4	23.1	20.7	17.1	12.2	28.9	19.9	17.9	16.1	15.0	13.6	10.1
30	37.4	25.7	23.8	22.0	19.1	16.0	11.1	25.6	18.6	16.6	15.2	14.2	12.9	9.4
20	34.5	22.6	21.9	20.2	17.5	14.7	9.7	21.9	17.0	15.4	14.3	13.4	12.0	8.7
10	28.8	19.1	19.8	17.2	14.7	11.0	8.4	18.8	15.0	13.7	13.0	12.2	10.7	7.8

== Effect of training ==
=== Non-athletes ===
The average untrained healthy male has a V̇O_{2} max of approximately 35–40 mL/(kg·min). The average untrained healthy female has a V̇O_{2} max of approximately 27–31 mL/(kg·min). These scores can improve with training and decrease with age, though the degree of trainability also varies widely.

=== Athletes ===
In sports where endurance is an important component in performance, such as road cycling, rowing, cross-country skiing, swimming, and long-distance running, world-class athletes typically have high V̇O_{2} max values. Elite male runners can consume up to 85 mL/(kg·min), and female elite runners can consume about 77 mL/(kg·min).

Norwegian triathlete Kristian Blummenfelt holds the record for the highest V̇O_{2} max ever tested with 101.1 mL/(kg·min).

=== Animals ===
V̇O_{2} max has been measured in other animal species. During loaded swimming, mice had a V̇O_{2} max of around 140 mL/(kg·min). Thoroughbred horses had a V̇O_{2} max of around 193 mL/(kg·min) after 18 weeks of high-intensity training. Alaskan huskies running in the Iditarod Trail Sled Dog Race had V̇O_{2} max values as high as 240 mL/(kg·min). Estimated V̇O_{2} max for pronghorn antelopes was as high as 300 mL/(kg·min).

== Limiting factors ==
The factors affecting V̇O_{2} may be separated into supply and demand. Supply is the transport of oxygen from the lungs to the mitochondria (combining pulmonary function, cardiac output, blood volume, and capillary density of the skeletal muscle) while demand is the rate at which the mitochondria can reduce oxygen in the process of oxidative phosphorylation. Of these, the supply factors may be more limiting. However, it has also been argued that while trained subjects are probably supply limited, untrained subjects can indeed have a demand limitation.

General characteristics that affect V̇O_{2} max include age, sex, fitness and training, and altitude. V̇O_{2} max can be a poor predictor of performance in runners due to variations in running economy and fatigue resistance during prolonged exercise. The body works as a system. If one of these factors is sub-par, then the whole system's normal capacity is reduced.

The drug erythropoietin (EPO) can boost V̇O_{2} max by a significant amount in both humans and other mammals. This makes EPO attractive to athletes in endurance sports, such as professional cycling. EPO has been banned since the 1990s as an illicit performance-enhancing substance, but by 1998 it had become widespread in cycling and led to the Festina affair as well as being mentioned ubiquitously in the USADA 2012 report on the U.S. Postal Service Pro Cycling Team. Greg LeMond has suggested establishing a baseline for riders' V̇O_{2} max (and other attributes) to detect abnormal performance increases.

== Clinical use to assess cardiorespiratory fitness and mortality ==
V̇O_{2} max/peak is widely used as an indicator of cardiorespiratory fitness (CRF) in select groups of athletes or, rarely, in people under assessment for disease risk. In 2016, the American Heart Association (AHA) published a scientific statement recommending that CRF – quantifiable as V̇O_{2} max/peak – be regularly assessed and used as a clinical vital sign; ergometry (exercise wattage measurement) may be used if V̇O_{2} is unavailable. This statement was based on evidence that lower fitness levels are associated with a higher risk of cardiovascular disease, all-cause mortality, and mortality rates. In addition to risk assessment, the AHA recommendation cited the value for measuring fitness to validate exercise prescriptions, physical activity counseling, and improve both management and health of people being assessed.

A 2023 meta-analysis of observational cohort studies showed an inverse and independent association between V̇O_{2} max and all-cause mortality risk. Every one metabolic equivalent increase in estimated cardiorespiratory fitness was associated with an 11% reduction in mortality. The top third of V̇O_{2} max scores represented a 45% lower mortality in people compared with the lowest third.

As of 2023, V̇O_{2} max is rarely employed in routine clinical practice to assess cardiorespiratory fitness or mortality due to its considerable demand for resources and costs.

== History ==
British physiologist Archibald Hill introduced the concepts of maximal oxygen uptake and oxygen debt in 1922. Hill and German physician Otto Meyerhof shared the 1922 Nobel Prize in Physiology or Medicine for their independent work related to muscle energy metabolism. Building on this work, scientists began measuring oxygen consumption during exercise. Key contributions were made by Henry Taylor at the University of Minnesota, Scandinavian scientists Per-Olof Åstrand and Bengt Saltin in the 1950s and 60s, the Harvard Fatigue Laboratory, German universities, and the Copenhagen Muscle Research Centre.

== See also ==
- Anaerobic exercise
- Arteriovenous oxygen difference
- Cardiorespiratory fitness
- Comparative physiology
- Oxygen pulse
- Respirometry
- Running economy
- Training effect
- VDOT
- vVO_{2}max
