= Running economy =

Concept in exercise physiology

Running economy (RE) is a complex, multifactorial concept that represents the sum of metabolic, cardiorespiratory, biomechanical and neuromuscular efficiency during running. Oxygen consumption (VO_{2}) is the most commonly used method for measuring running economy, as the exchange of gases in the body, specifically oxygen and carbon dioxide, closely reflects energy metabolism. Those who are able to consume less oxygen while running at a given velocity are said to have a better running economy. However, straightforward oxygen usage does not account for whether the body is metabolising lipids or carbohydrates, which produce different amounts of energy per unit of oxygen; as such, accurate measurements of running economy must use O_{2} and CO_{2} data to estimate the calorific content of the substrate that the oxygen is being used to respire.

In distance running, an athlete may attempt to improve performance through training designed to improve running economy. Running economy has been found to be a good predictor of race performance; it has been found to be a stronger correlate of performance than maximal oxygen uptake (VO_{2} max) in trained runners with the same values.

The idea of running economy is increasingly used to understand performance, as new technology can drastically lower running times over marathon distances, independently of physiology or even training. Factors affecting running economy include a runner's biology, training regimens, equipment, and environment.

== Measurement and values ==
=== Measurement ===
Running Economy is calculated by measuring VO₂ while running on a treadmill at various constant speeds for anywhere between three and fifteen minutes. VO₂ is the amount of oxygen consumed in milliliters over one minute and normalized by kilogram of body weight. To compare running economies between individuals, VO₂ is interpolated to common running velocities while also quantifying how much oxygen is needed to run one kilometer relative to body mass. A lower value of running economy demonstrates better running efficiency and provides a good predictor for race performance. A new method for measuring such concepts can be found with the help of the use of wireless foot-worn inertial sensors together with dedicated signal processing algorithms.

=== Values of running economy ===
Normative running economy data for male and female runners of varying ability levels
		Male mean (range)		Female mean (range)	
Runner classification	Speed (km/h)	Running economy (ml/kg/min)	VO 2 max (ml/kg/min)	Running economy (ml/kg/min)	VO 2 max (ml/kg/min)
Recreational	14	47.4 (46.0–49.5)	54.2 (51.0–57.8)	47.3 (40.1–51.9)	49.7 (45.2–54.1)
Moderately Trained	14	46.8 (42.0–55.5)	62.2 (56.6–69.1)	47.9 (41.3–53.5)	55.8 (50.5–59.4)
Highly Trained	14	45.0 (32.4–56.5)	70.8 (65.3–80.2)	48.3 (39.0–56.7)	61.7 (56.2–72.3)
Elite	14	39.9 (36.1–44.5)	75.4 (68.2–84.1)	41.9 (38.7–46.9)	66.6 (61.1–74.2)

== Factors affecting running economy ==
There are a number of variables that may affect running economy: vertical motion while running, the ability of the muscles to absorb energy during the shock of landing and transfer it to push-off, biomechanical factors, technique and type of activity, fitness and training, age, fatigue, gender, race, weight of clothing and shoes, and environmental conditions.

Various studies have shown marathon runners to be more economical than middle distance runners and sprinters at speeds of 10 to 19 kilometres per hour (6 to 12 mph). At those speeds, film analysis has shown that sprinters and middle distance have more vertical motion than marathoners.

=== Anthropometry ===
Running economy also depends on many innate characteristics with some body characteristics naturally giving runners an advantage. Some of these include height, limb length, and body mass distribution in certain areas of the body.

Limbs are a greater distance from a person's center of mass, so they have greater rotational inertia compared to the rest of the body. As a result, limbs require more energy to move, so their morphology plays a role in running economy. In the legs, an increased weight in the feet relates to running economy since they are located most distally from the hips, slightly smaller than average feet are ideal for optimizing running economy. This is also why shoe choice affects running economy. Weight carried in the thighs also plays a role with weight distributed closer to the hip joint, but does not affect running economy as much as foot morphology. In one study, weights were added to the runners' feet and thighs and they found that VO₂ consumption increased twice as much in trials with weights on feet compared to thighs. While the distribution of mass in limbs has been correlated to running economy, there is no consensus on whether or not limb length is a factor.

An ideal body for optimal running economy would include height slightly smaller than average for males and slightly greater for females, low body fat percentage, leg mass distributed closer to the hip joint, and a narrow pelvis with smaller than average feet. It has also been shown that there might be an inverse relationship between body weight and running economy. However this relationship is small, as the energy used in running is similar among people of different sizes. It's also possible that this relation has nothing to do with body mass and could be caused by inter-individual differences in physique.

=== Physiology ===
There are many physiological conditions that can affect running economy including maximal oxygen uptake, metabolic factors, tendon length, and ventilation. Running economy has also been observed to decrease towards the end of races while core temperature, heart rate, ventilation, and lactic acid increase. Therefore, training to decrease those factors could improve running economy.

Metabolic energy is the amount of energy (ATP) that the body can produce from oxygen intake and nutrients available in the body. Factors that affect metabolism would be important for improved running economy so as to efficiently utilize the body's resources. Because oxygen is necessary for aerobic respiration, the higher VO₂ max a runner has, the longer they will be able to run without going into anaerobic respiration and accumulate lactic acid buildup. It is also preferable that a runner's body can burn fat as an energy source under intense work loads, in addition to carbohydrates. Fat takes more steps to metabolize than carbohydrates, so using them as an energy source is more expensive, but they contain more energy per molecule.

When running, the Achilles tendon becomes stretched by flexion of the foot and stores some of that energy as elastic energy. Studies have shown that utilization of this elastic energy has a medium to large impact on reducing running energy. Energy stored in the tendon depends on how much the tendon is stretched and its internal properties. A shorter Achilles tendon moment arm length (the length between the tendon and force stretching it) will produce more energy, similar to how tightness in muscles stores and releases elastic energy.

=== Training ===
Running economy is often used as a measure of an endurance runners performance, so there have been many different methods of improving it studied. One drawback of these studies is that participants are typically not elite athletes, who have difficulty improving running economy significantly. Other criticisms of these studies include small sample size, too few measurements to account for intra-individual fluctuations, and other factors that affect running economy. Regardless, studies have been published examining how methods such as plyometrics, strength, or endurance training affect participants. There have also been studies into how environmental factors such as altitude training and heat training affect runners.

Plyometric training has been observed to increase the amount of force that muscles can generate in a short interval of time. In one study, plyometric training led to faster ten kilometer race times, despite decreasing the total amount of distance run in training. Because this type of training does not improve VO_{₂} max its success has been attributed to an increased tension in the muscles and tendons. An increased stiffness in those areas allows for greater efficiency in using elastic energy stored when they become stretched, allowing for a shorter impact time with the ground.

One of the most common approaches to training for improving running economy is strength training. One study compared endurance training and a mix of endurance and strength training and found that while the mixed group had a considerably lower VO₂ their running economies actually increased. The two main reasons attributed to this increase are adaptations in the nervous system and a change in the type of muscle fibers. Heavy-load strength training has been shown to increase the amount of motor neurons activated when a muscle is contracted, producing a greater force. This reason is most commonly attributed because strength training is often associated with hypertrophy, causing an increase in muscle size, which would be disadvantageous for running economy. Strength training also causes muscles to undergo a change from fast twitch fibers to slow twitch fibers, which are more immune to fatigue.

Studies have also been conducted to observe how environmental factors affect training. At high altitudes, metabolic erythropoietin increases the production of red blood cells to compensate for the lack of oxygen. Altitude exposure also demonstrates measurable differences in metabolic activity in muscles. Studies have shown that running economy improves considerably when training/sleeping at high altitudes and competing near sea level. Heat training has also proved to be effective, with an increased core temperature improving working efficiency of muscles. While an increased core temperature is beneficial to the muscles, a lower core temperature is preferred. When moving back to a normal temperature after training at higher temperatures, runners display a lower core temperature as well as heart rate.

=== Biomechanics ===
Stride length, body kinematics, kinetics, and elastic energy are biomechanical factors associated with improved running economy. The natural stride length of a trained athlete is related to a better running economy rather than any specific adjustments. Body kinematics encompass a variety of movement parameters associated with a better running economy.

A runner with a better running economy has a relatively low amplitude of their center of mass, increased swing of the lower legs during a stride (decreased angle of the back of their knee), and increased angular velocity of plantar flexion during push-off, but has a reduced range of movement during plantar flexion.

Other biomechanical factors associated with better running economy includes faster rotation of the shoulders, limiting of arm motion to moderate motion, a greater angular movement of the hips and shoulders with respect to the transverse plane of the runner, and lower peak levels of force on the ground.

Flexibility of lower limb and torso in trained athletes improves running economy at all speeds through increased range of movement in the hips. Conversely, some studies have found that reduced flexibility in the calf and hip regions improve running economy by reducing the need for further muscle stabilization. Similar to a more tightly wound spring, less flexible muscles have increased energy storage and return of elastic energy.

=== Shoes ===
Lightweight running shoes (<440g per pair) have been shown to have a statistical improvement upon running economy. However, between barefoot running and lightweight shoes, there is no demonstrable differences.

Cushioning has also been shown to reduce oxygen uptake and therefore running economy by providing an elastic energy storage of the downward force. The shoe cushion itself needs to be of an optimal 'spring rate' in order to beneficially complement the muscle movements and forces.

Recent research has shown that the addition of a carbon-fiber plate in the midsole of a shoe coupled with a springy foam benefits running economy by reducing negative work done by the metatarsophalangeal joint.

=== Environmental conditions ===
Training in warm temperatures increases core temperature which has been shown to improve running economy by improving the working efficiency of muscles. This creates a lasting effect when running at lower temperatures in which a relatively lower core temperatures can be achieved. A lower core temperature is associated with reduced increases in breathing, sweating and circulation at aerobic intensity, thereby increasing overall energy efficiency and improving running economy.

== Running economy in the media ==
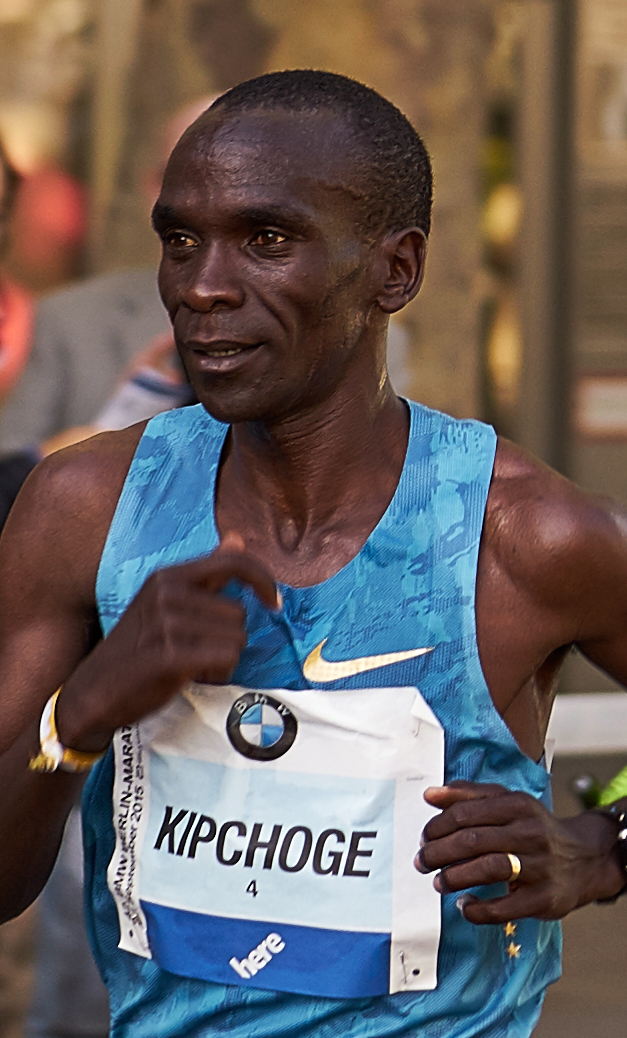
Eliud Kipchoge in Berlin Marathon 2015

=== Breaking2 Project ===
The Breaking2 project was an event put on by Nike to break the marathon sub two hour barrier. The event utilized running economy in order to identify and improve factors that would aid in accomplishing the feat. The three runners included Lelisa Desisa, Eliud Kipchoge, and Zersenay Tadese. Eliud Kipchoge won the race with a time of 2:00:25, but ultimately failed to run the marathon in under two hours.

Many runners were screened for the event, and ultimately Lelisa Desisa, Eliud Kipchoge, and Zersenay Tadese were chosen based on their potential. Physiological data was acquired from each runner along with their training regiments and personal records to estimate runner projections. To acquire data from each contestant, the Nike science team gave each runner GPS watches and heart rate monitors. Additionally, they visited each runner in their hometown to analyze hydration and nutrition strategies while monitoring skin temperature and sweat rates.

The Breaking2 project team determined that the most critical parameter was the difference in skin temperature and internal body temperature, also known as temperature gradient. Temperature gradient describes how rapidly temperature changes in relation to spatial location. In terms of running economy, a high difference between skin temperature and internal body temperature correlates with an improved running economy. In order to optimize this measurement for the athletes, the Breaking2 project was set to run over a three day window. This allowed for optimal weather conditions regarding temperature, wind, and cloud cover. Moreover, the race took place in Northern Italy because of its wooded climate and racing routes with gradual curves. The Breaking2 project team also decided to focus on hydration and nutrition. In order to measure water loss, the runners were weighed before and after their training sessions, and muscle imaging was used to analyze the amount of sugar in the athlete's muscles. To combat the loss of water and sugar, the Nike team crafted sugar-water mixtures for each athlete. Slight modifications to the athletes diets were also tested, such as having Eliud Kipchoge eat beetroot bars instead of drinking beet juice.

=== Ineos159 Challenge ===
The Ineos159 challenge took place in Vienna, Austria, and was run by Eliud Kipchoge in an attempt to run a marathon in under two hours. Eliud Kipchoge ran the race in 1:59:40 which translates to just under 2:50 min/km or 21.98 km/h.

Nutrition is a key aspect of running economy, and it was crucial to Kipchoge's success. Prior to the race, Eliud Kipchoge increased his carbohydrate intake in order to supply his muscles with fuel. Without carbohydrates, the body breaks down fats in a process called lipid metabolism. However, most elite runners do not have a high body fat percentage. During the race, he was consuming about 60 to 100 grams of carbohydrates every hour. He did this by consuming a 500 mL drink consisting of 80 grams of carbohydrates. This was a change from his previous attempt at the Breaking2 project where he drank 50 mL drinks every few kilometers. Larger drinks supply fuel to the muscles sooner, but they have an increased chance of causing intestinal discomfort.

Location and weather were also heavily considered because of their impact on running economy. Vienna was picked for multiple reasons. Firstly, the city is very flat which requires less energy expenditure. Secondly, the city is relatively close to sea level resulting in a higher concentration of oxygen in the air. The high oxygen level allows athletes to better perform aerobic exercises. Lastly, the race was run on a morning with low humidity and temperature levels. During the Breaking2 project, where Eliud Kipchoge failed to run a marathon in under two hours, there was unexpected rain. The extra moisture can increase the weight of the runner and reduce road traction.

== See also ==
- VDOT
