= Fick =

Fick may refer to:

- Adolf Eugen Fick (1829–1901), German physiologist, after whom are named:
  - Fick principle, technique for measuring the cardiac output
  - Fick's law of diffusion, describing the diffusion
  - tonometer, both useful in music and ophthalmology
- Adolf Gaston Eugen Fick (1852–1937), German ophthalmologist nephew of Adolf Eugen Fick, inventor of the contact lens.
- August Fick (1833–1916), German philologist
- Carl Fick (1918–1990), American author and director
- Chuckie Fick (born 1985), American baseball player
- Emil Fick (1863–1930), Swedish fencer
- Franz Ludwig Fick (1813–1858), German anatomist
- Jacob Fick (1912–2004), German SS officer
- John Fick (1921–1958), American baseball player
- Leonard J. Fick (1915–1990), American Catholic priest
- Nathaniel Fick (born 1977), US Marine Corps officer
- Peter Fick (1913–1980), American swimmer
- Robert Fick (born 1974), American baseball player
- Roderich Fick (1886–1955), German architect
- Sigrid Fick (1887–1979), Swedish tennis player

== See also ==
- Ficken
- Fuck (disambiguation)
