= Lycée Vaucanson =

Lycée Vaucanson may refer to:

- Lycée Jacques de Vaucanson in Tours
- Lycée Vaucanson in Grenoble
- Lycée Jacques Vaucanson in Les Mureaux (Paris area)
