= Fickett (surname) =

Fickett is a surname of English origin. Notable people with the surname include:

- Andrew Robert Fickett (born 1979), American mixed martial arts fighter
- Homer Fickett (1897 or 1898–1953). American radio director
- Mary Fickett (1928–2011), American actress

== See also ==
- Fick
- Fickert
