= Calamita quadrilineatus =

Conservation status
- Data Deficient (IUCN 3.1)

Scientific classification
- Kingdom: Animalia
- Phylum: Chordata
- Class: Amphibia
- Order: Anura
- Family: Hylidae
- Genus: Calamita
- Species: "C." quadrilineatus

Binomial name
- "Calamita" quadrilineatus Schneider, 1799

Synonyms
- Rana quadrilineata; Hyla quadrilineata

Species of amphibian

"Calamita" quadrilineatus is a possible species of frog described in 1799. The type locality is unknown, but the original publication considered Calamita quadrilineatus to be similar to Hyla leucophyllata. The status of this name placed in the subfamily Hylinae is unclear and it is considered a nomen dubium. The type series is presumed to be lost.
