= Hjalmar August Schiøtz =

German ophthalmologist

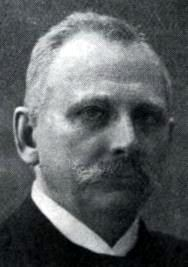
- Hjalmar Schiøtz
- Born: 9 February 1850; Stavanger, Norway
- Died: 8 December 1927 (aged 77)
- Citizenship: Norway
- Education: University of Oslo
- Known for: Schiøtz tonometer, Javal-Schiøtz ophthalmometer
- Scientific career
- Fields: ophthalmology

Hjalmar August Schiøtz (9 February 1850 – 8 December 1927) was a Norwegian physician, ophthalmologist and educator. Schiøtz is credited as being Norway's first professor of ophthalmology.

He was born in Stavanger, Norway. In 1877 he received his medical degree from the University of Kristiania (now University of Oslo) later studying ophthalmology in Vienna, where he befriended Ernst Fuchs (1851-1930), and in Paris, where he was employed as "directeur adjoint" in the ophthalmology laboratory at the Sorbonne. In 1884 he became head of a polyclinic for ear, nose, throat and eye diseases in Kristiania. Dating from 1898, he started teaching ophthalmology at the Oslo University Hospital, Rikshospitalet. He was dean of the Faculty of Medicine from 1914 to 1916 and retired in 1921.

He was also a skilled technician and mathematician. While in Paris, he invented a keratometer with Dr. Louis Émile Javal that was to become known as the Javal-Schiøtz ophthalmometer, an optical instrument used to measure the curvature of the anterior corneal surface. He presented an early version of the instrument at the international congress of eye specialists in Milan (1880), and demonstrated the finished product at the International Medical Congress in London (1881). In 1905 Schiøtz invented the "Schiøtz tonometer", which is an indentation tonometer used to measure intraocular pressure.
