= Vaucanson Flute Player =

18th-century automaton

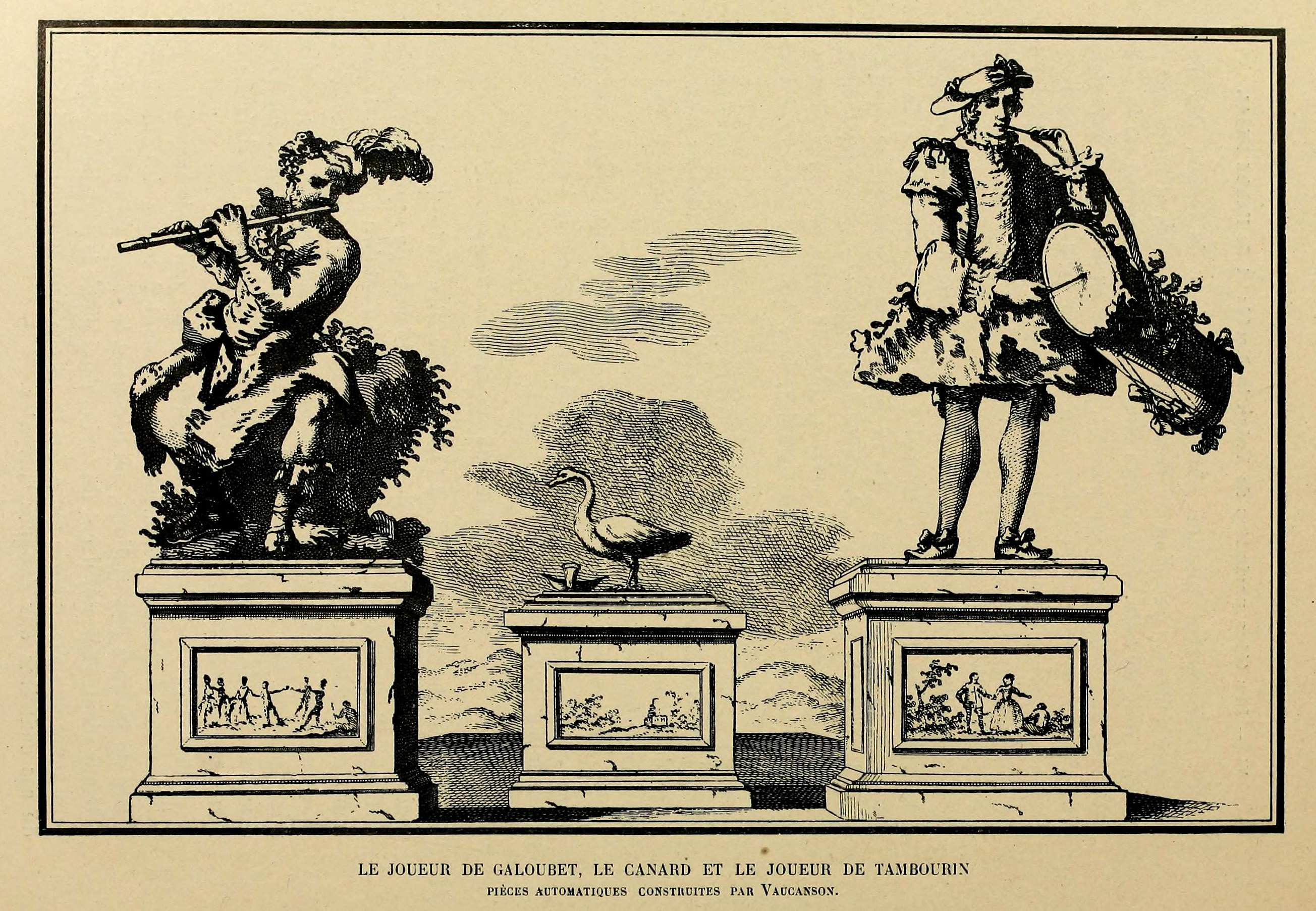
Advertising poster for the presentation of Vaucanson's three automatons in Strasbourg in 1746

The Vaucanson Automat Flute Player is an android automaton playing the transverse flute, designed and produced by Jacques de Vaucanson and presented to the public in 1738. It faithfully recreates the playing of a flautist on an instrument identical to those in use at the time.

== The automaton ==
The idea of an automated flutist came to Vaucanson while he was observing the statue of the Faun playing the flute, also known as the Shepherd Flutist, by Antoine Coysevox in the Tuileries Garden.

Begun in 1735, the automaton was completed in October 1737. After a brief exhibition at the Foire Saint-Germain, it was put on a paid demonstration in January 1738 at the Hôtel de Longueville, where Vaucanson had his workshop. The public is divided between skepticism and admiration, and Voltaire describes the inventor as "rival of Prometheus". At first reluctant, but at the express request of Louis XV transmitted by his prime minister, Cardinal de Fleury, the members of the French Academy of Sciences went to the Hôtel de Longueville to examine the automaton. Vaucanson made a detailed presentation to them in his memoir of April 30, 1738, and the Academy returned a laudatory report signed by the perpetual secretary Bernard Le Bovier de Fontenelle, with approval for printing by Henri Pitot:

The Academy, having heard the reading of a Memoir by Mr. Vaucanson containing the description of a wooden statue, copied from Coysevox's marble faun, playing the transverse flute, upon which it performs twelve different tunes with a precision that has deserved the attention of the public, and of which a large part of the Academy has been witness, judged that this machine was extremely ingenious, that the author must have employed simple and new means, both to give the fingers of this figure the necessary movements and to modify the air entering the flute, by increasing or decreasing the speed according to the different tones, by varying the arrangement of the lips, and by moving a valve that performs the function of the tongue; finally, by imitating through art everything that man is obliged to do, and that furthermore, Mr. Vaucanson's Memoir had all the clarity and precision that this machine is capable of, which proves the intelligence of the author and his great knowledge in the various parts of mechanics.

— Jacques de Vaucanson

To illustrate his article «Android», the Encyclopédie gives an extremely detailed description in 1751, largely taken from the memoir of 1738. The flutist, approximately 1.60 metres (63 in) high, resting on a 1.45 metres (57 in) pedestal hiding the mechanism, was a slightly reduced imitation of the Coysevox faun, dressed in savage clothing. (Note: The "savage" cultures (Chinese, Persians, Indians, etc.) were particularly fashionable, as evidenced by the success of Jean-Philippe Rameau's Les Indes galantes, from 1735-1736.)

From 1741, the Fluter was exhibited in several cities in France and in Italy with two other creations by Vaucanson, the Digesting Duck and the Provençal Tambourinaire.

Rented for a year to three Lyon merchants, including a certain Pierre Dumoulin, master glover-perfumer, the automatons were exhibited in London in 1742, then purchased in Vaucanson at the end of the lease. Dumoulin made them travel to the Netherlands, France, notably Strasbourg in 1746, and Germany, where, due to lack of money, their journey was interrupted in 1755 at a pawnbroker in Nuremberg. As a precaution, Dumoulin made the automatons unusable, reversing parts of the Flutor and the Tambourinaire. Having left for Russia, he died there without ever coming to reclaim his property. (Note: The place and date of Dumoulin's death remain uncertain: Moscow, 1765 (Journal général de France, 1787, vol.6, n° 15, p. 58-59), Saint Petersburg, before 1781 (Doyon et Liaigre, p. 95, note 68).)

After thirty years of abandonment in Nuremberg, the automatons passed into the hands of several owners and repair mechanics, but it seems that, unlike the Duck, the Flutor and the Drummer never worked again. Gottfried Christoph Beireis, professor of medicine in Helmstedt and collector of curiosities, after purchasing the automata in 1784, called on Johann Georg Bischoff Jr. to restore them, and declared himself satisfied with the result; nevertheless, to modernize the flautist's repertoire, he had the cylinder replaced with a mechanical musical instrument performing one of his favorite tunes, taken from Carl Heinrich Graun's opera Brittanico, which he had previously heard on a musical clock. Abusing the credulity of the rich collector, a charlatan promised to improve the fluter by integrating a device that would allow it to play on sight any sheet that was presented to it. He disappeared without leaving an address; his intervention would have put an end to any possibility of further restoration. Goethe, who visited Beireis in 1805, wrote in his Tag- und Jahreshefte: "Der Flötenspieler war verstummt" (the flautist had become mute). Around 1840, automatons, including the famous Duck, were entrusted for repair to Johann Bartholomé Rechsteiner, but nothing indicates that he succeeded in putting the flute back in working order, if indeed he really had this automaton in his hands. (Note: In Jakob Vogel's work (1863), J.B. Rechsteiner, Glarus: Vogel, p. 24, the description of the "Flute Player of Vaucanson" ("a gentleman, a lady, and in the middle a boy are sitting on a sofa. The lady is accompanied by the flute player, while the boy plays the tambourine and keeps the rhythm with his feet. The movement of the fingers and head was deceptively imitated; the sound was actually produced by breath, and by disturbing the play of keys, the spectator could modify the sequence of notes") does not correspond at all to Vaucanson's automaton: "J.B. Rechsteiner". digital.slub-dresden.de (in German)..)

The last recorded exhibition of the Flûteur was that of September 1863 in Paris, organized by the automaton specialist Blaise Bontems, which however remains uncertain. (Note: One might doubt that the flute player, let alone its "restoration," was presented on this occasion: in the exhibitions of the Bontems in Lyon, Valence, Avignon, and Marseille that preceded the one in Paris, there is mention of the success of the Duck, but nothing is said about the Flute Player (Doyon and Liaigre, p.104-105).) It is unknown what happened to it afterwards; at the end of the 19th century, it would have been present in Vienna, mentioned then as the only authentic Vaucanson automaton still surviving. (Note: This information, however, had already been debunked in 1882 in Le Magasin pittoresque: "The automaton flute player is not in Vienna, as is generally believed."Le Magasin Pittoresque (1882). Le Magasin Pittoresque (in French). Vol. 50. pp. 121–122.)

=== The flute and sound production ===
Removable and replaceable, the flute was in all likelihood, and unlike the galoubet of the Provençal Tambourinaire, the only part not built by Vaucanson and his watchmaking workers. The memoir of 1738 and the article Android of the Encyclopedia indicate that this flute is in D, that it requires the active role of three fingers of the left hand and four of the right hand, and, as is seen on the engravings of the Carnavalet museum and the National Library, it was in four parts.
