= Carl Ludwig =

German physician and physiologist (1816–1895)

Carl Ludwig ForMemRS
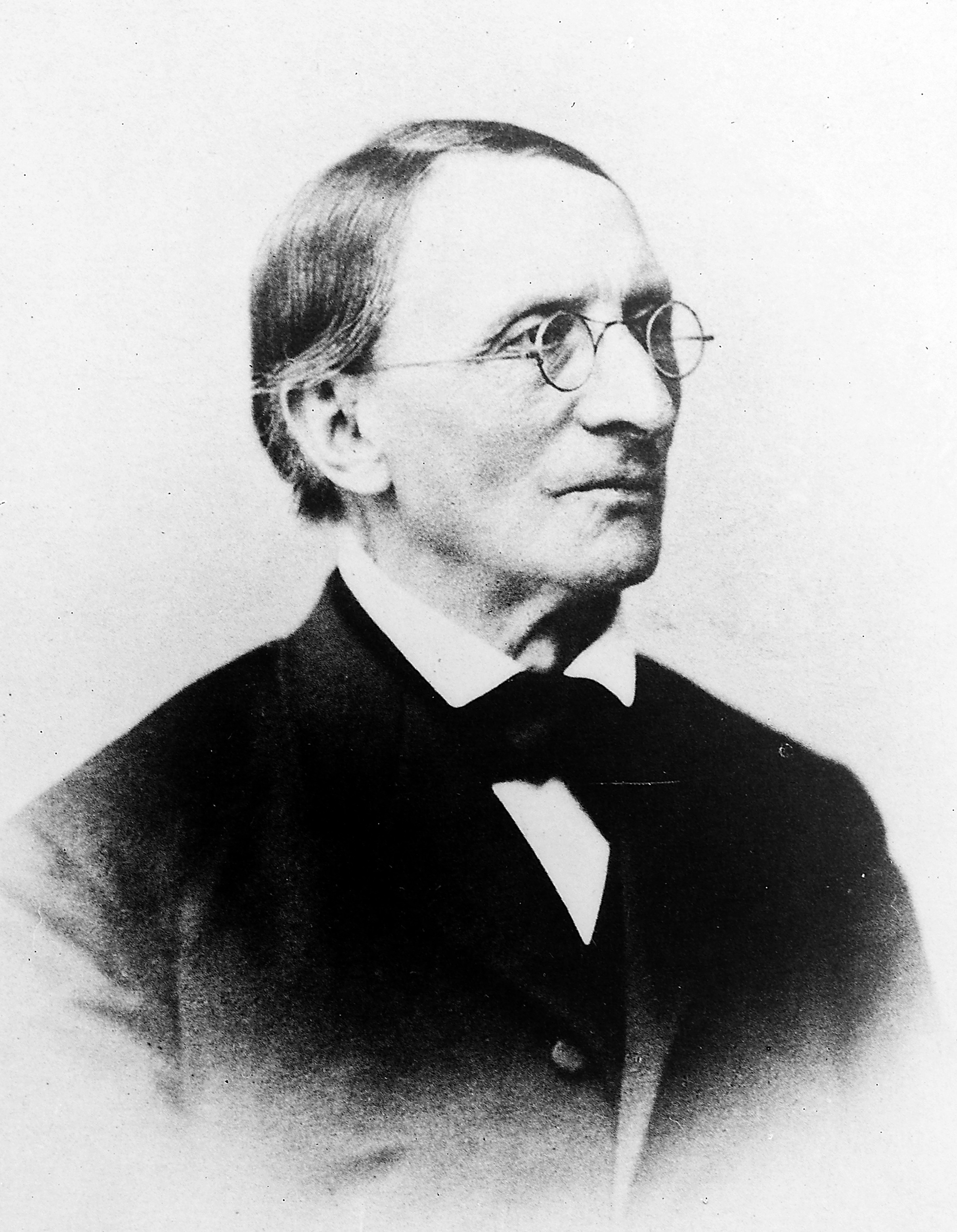
- Born: Carl Friedrich Wilhelm Ludwig; 29 December 1816; Witzenhausen, Electorate of Hesse
- Died: 23 April 1895 (aged 78); Leipzig, German Empire
- Education: University of Erlangen, University of Marburg (MD, 1840)
- Known for: Ludwig–Soret effect Kymograph
- Awards: Copley Medal (1884); ForMemRS (1875)
- Scientific career
- Fields: Physiology
- Workplaces: University of Marburg, University of Zurich, Leipzig University
- Doctoral students: Otto Frank
- Other notable students: Richard Avenarius

Carl Friedrich Wilhelm Ludwig (German: [ˈluːtvɪç]; 29 December 1816 – 23 April 1895) was a German physician and physiologist. His work as both a researcher and teacher had a major influence on the understanding, methods and apparatus used in almost all branches of physiology.

In 1842, Ludwig became a professor of physiology and in 1846 of comparative anatomy. From professorships in Zurich and Vienna he went in 1865 to the University of Leipzig and developed there the Physiological Institute, designated today after him: Carl Ludwig Institute of Physiology. Ludwig researched several topics such as the physiology of blood pressure, urinary excretion, and anesthesia. He received the Copley Medal in 1884 for his research. In 1869, he was elected a foreign member of the Royal Swedish Academy of Sciences. He is credited for inventing the stromuhr.

Since 1932, the Carl Ludwig Honorary Medal is awarded by the German Society for Cardiology to outstanding investigators in the area of cardiovascular research.

== Life ==
Ludwig was born at Witzenhausen, near Kassel, and studied medicine at Erlangen and Marburg, taking his doctor's degree at Marburg in 1839. He made Marburg his home for the next ten years, studying and teaching anatomy and physiology, first as prosector to FL Fick (1841), then as privat-docent (1842), and finally as extraordinary professor (1846). In 1849 he was chosen professor of anatomy and physiology at Zurich, and 6 years afterwards he went to Vienna as professor in the Josephinum school for military surgeons.

In 1865 Ludwig was appointed to the newly created chair of physiology at Leipzig, and continued there until his death on 23 April 1895. In 1892, he was elected as an honorary member of the Manchester Literary and Philosophical Society,

== Appraisal ==
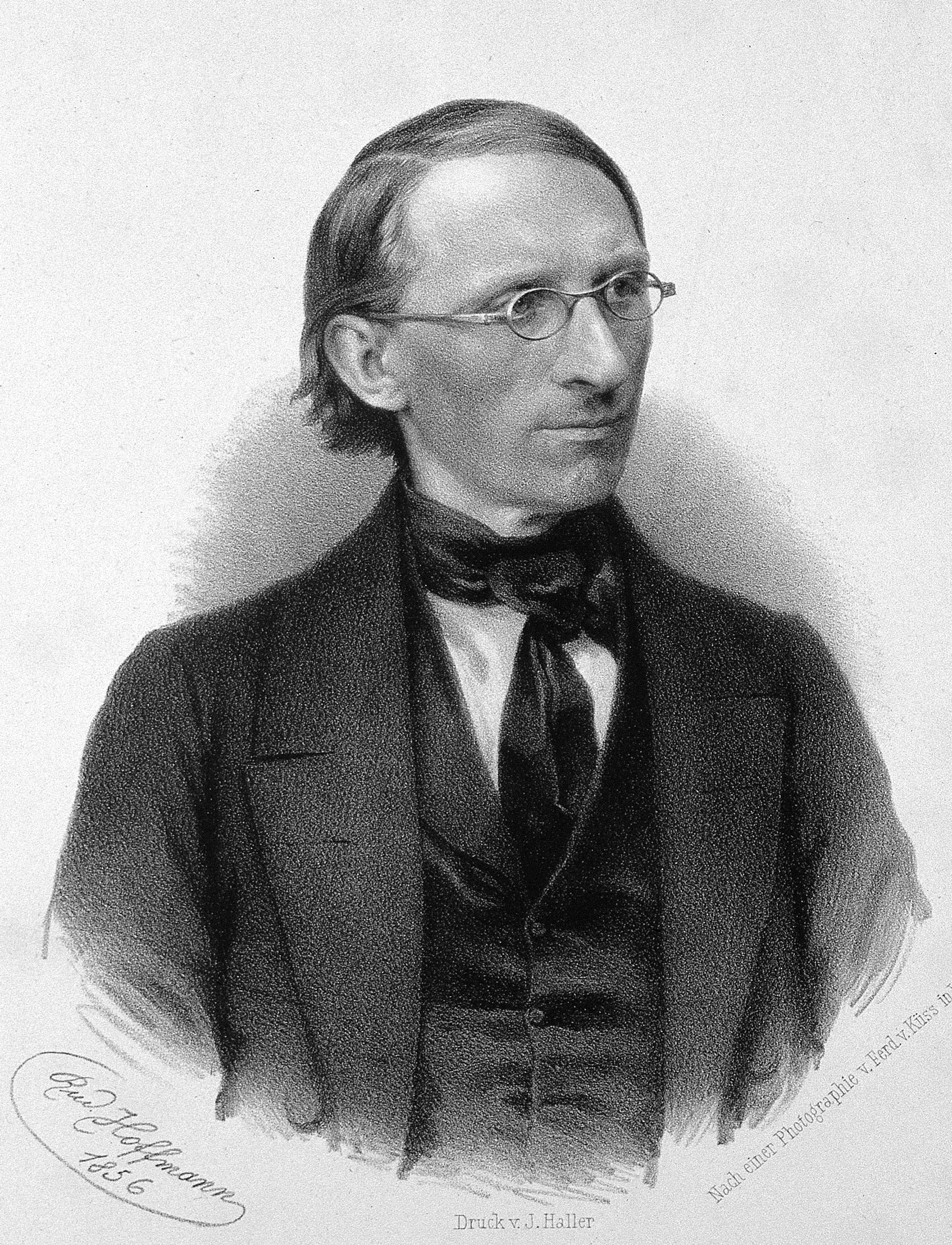
Carl Ludwig in 1856

Ludwig's name is prominent in the history of physiology, and he had a large share in bringing about the change in the method of that science that took place in the middle of the 19th century. With his friends Hermann Ludwig Ferdinand von Helmholtz, Ernst Wilhelm von Brücke, and Emil du Bois-Reymond, whom he met for the first time in Berlin in 1847, he rejected the assumption that the phenomena of living animals depend on special biological laws and vital forces different from those that operate in the domain of inorganic nature; and he sought to explain them by reference to the same laws as are applicable in the case of physical and chemical phenomena.

This point of view was expressed in Ludwig's celebrated Text-book of Human Physiology (1852–1856), but it is as evident in his earliest paper (1842) on the process of urinary secretion as in all his subsequent work. Ludwig exercised enormous influence on the progress of physiology, not only by the discoveries he made, but also by the new methods and apparatus he introduced to its service. Thus, in regard to secretion, he showed that secretory glands, such as the submaxillary, are more than mere filters, and that their secretory action is attended by chemical and thermal changes both in themselves and in the blood passing through them.

Ludwig demonstrated the existence of a new class of secretory nerves that control this action, and by showing that if the nerves are appropriately stimulated the salivary glands continue to secrete, even though the animal be decapitated, he initiated the method of experimenting with excised organs. He devised the kymograph as a means of obtaining a written record of the variations in the pressure of the blood in the blood vessels; and this apparatus not only conducted him to many important conclusions respecting the mechanics of the circulation, but afforded the first instance of the use of the graphic method in physiological inquiries. For researches on blood gases, he designed the mercurial blood-pump that, with various modifications, has come into extensive use. He used it for many investigations into gases of the lymph, the gaseous interchanges in living muscle, the significance of oxidized material in the blood, etc.

There is indeed scarcely any branch of physiology, except the physiology of the senses, to which Ludwig did not make important contributions. He was also a great power as a teacher and the founder of a school. Under him the Physiological Institute at Leipzig became an organized center of physiological research, whence issued a steady stream of original work; and though the papers containing the results usually bore the name of his pupils only, every investigation was inspired by him and carried out under his personal direction. Thus, his pupils gained a practical acquaintance with his methods and ways of thought, and, coming from all parts of Europe, they returned to their own countries to spread and extend his doctrines. Possessed himself of extraordinary manipulative skill, he abhorred rough and clumsy work, and he insisted that experiments on animals should be planned and prepared with the utmost care, not only to avoid the infliction of pain (which was also guarded against by the use of an anesthetic), but to ensure that the deductions drawn from them should have their full scientific value.
