= Franz Ludwig Fick =

German anatomist

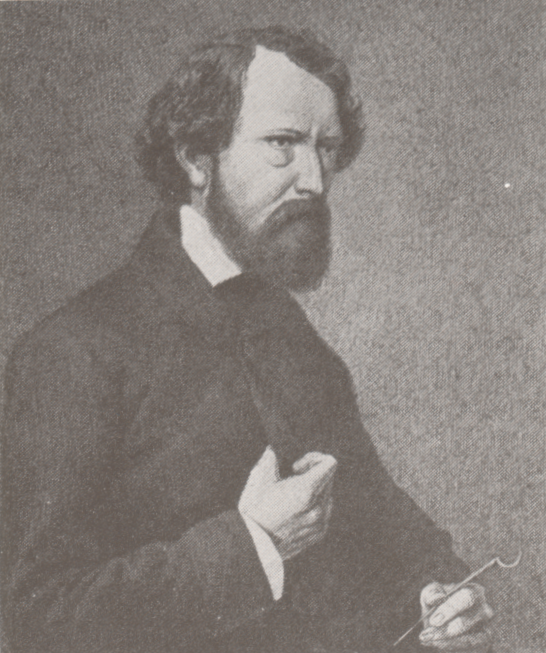
- Franz Ludwig Fick (1813-1858)
- Born: 18 May 1813; Erlangen
- Died: 31 December 1858 (aged 45); Marburg
- Education: University of Marburg
- Known for: Cerebral phantom
- Scientific career
- Fields: Anatomist
- Workplaces: University of Marburg
- Doctoral advisor: Christian Heinrich Bünger
- Doctoral students: Adolf Fick
- Other notable students: Carl Ludwig

Notes
- He is the brother of the German physiologist Adolf Eugen Fick who invented tonometry. He is the father of the German ophthalmologist Adolf Gaston Eugen Fick who invented the contact lens.

Franz Ludwick Fick (18 May 1813 – 31 December 1858) was a professor of anatomy at the University of Marburg.

== Education ==
In 1835, he received his MD under Bünger from the University of Marburg.

== Career ==
Fick studied the developmental mechanics of bone growth, especially of the skull. He invented the cerebral phantom - an openable paper model showing the various parts of the brain that became the prototype of openable figures in medical texts. Fick wrote texts on human anatomy and pathology. He studied the mechanism of vision and the function of the retina. He investigated the function and performance of the taste buds and described the anatomy of elephant's ears.

== Books by Fick ==
- Franz Ludwig Fick, Tractatus de illegitimo vasorum cursu hominibus innato cum tabulis duabus, typis Elwerti academicis, 1854.
