= Justus Christian Loder =

German anatomist and surgeon (1753–1832)

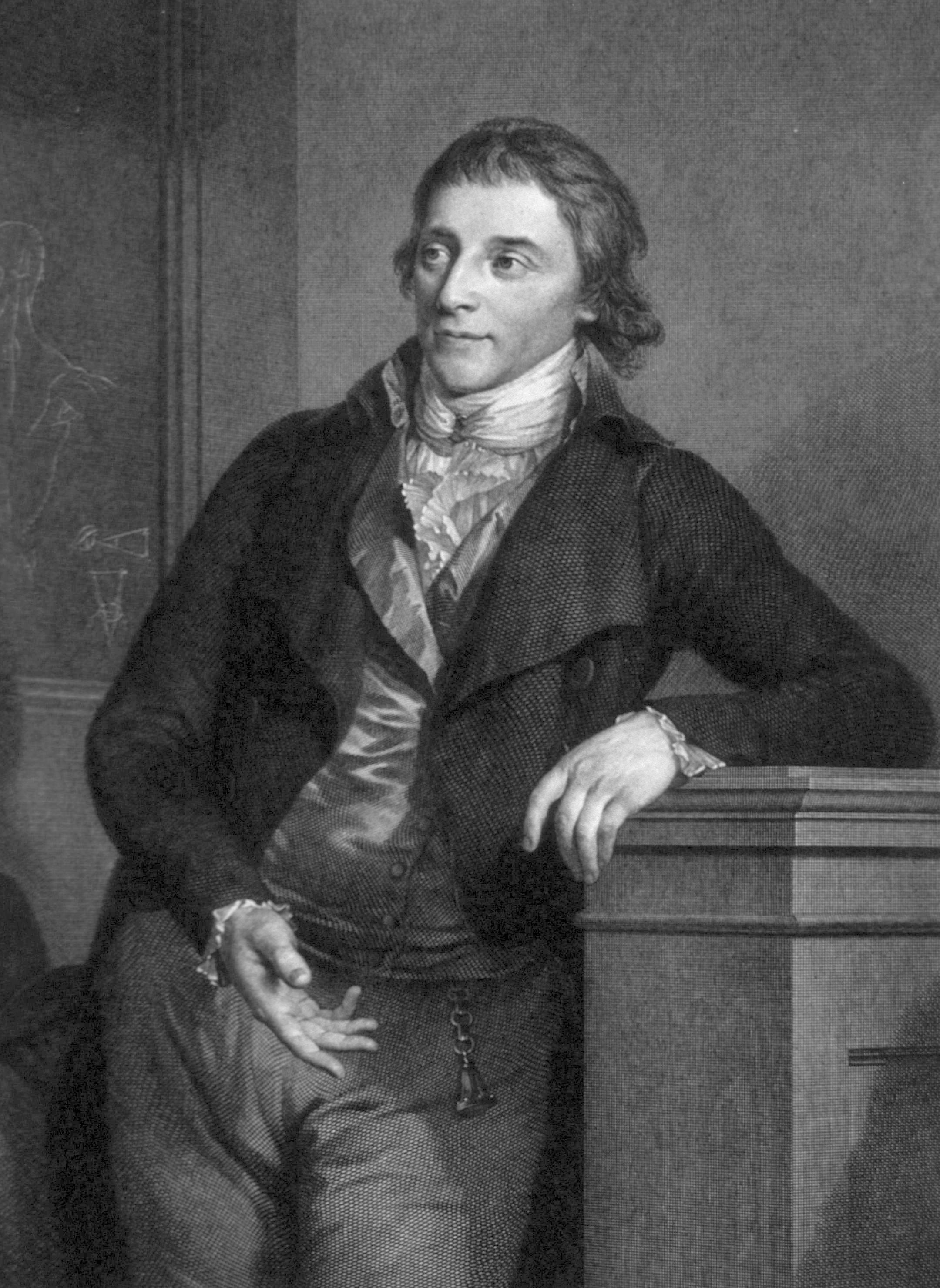
- Born: Ferdinand Justus Christian Loder; 12 March 1753; Riga, Russian Empire
- Died: 16 April 1832 (aged 79); Moscow, Russian Empire
- Education: University of Göttingen
- Scientific career
- Fields: Anatomist, surgeon, physiologist, and obstetrician
- Workplaces: University of Jena; University of Halle
- Doctoral advisor: Heinrich August Wrisberg; August Gottlieb Richter
- Doctoral students: Christian Heinrich Bünger
- Other notable students: Christoph Wilhelm Hufeland

Ferdinand Justus Christian von Loder (12 March 1753 – 16 April 1832) was a German anatomist and surgeon who was a native of Riga.

== Biography ==
In 1777 Loder earned his medical doctorate at the University of Göttingen, and the following year was appointed professor of surgery and anatomy at the University of Jena, where he practiced medicine for the next 25 years. At Jena he was responsible for the establishment of an anatomical theatre and an Accouchierhaus (maternity house). In 1780-81, at the expense of the Duke of Weimar, he took a scientific journey to France, England and Holland, a trip in which he made the acquaintance of several well-known physicians and scientists: Louis-Jean-Marie Daubenton, Jean-Louis Baudelocque, Félix Vicq-d'Azyr and John Hunter, among others.

In 1803 he transferred to the University of Halle, where he established a clinic of obstetrics. After the closing of the University of Halle by Napoleon in 1806, he became personal physician to the Prussian royal family at Königsberg.

He was ennobled in 1809. Later that year he relocated to Russia, where in 1810 he became personal physician to Czar Alexander I. Between 1814 and 1817 he was in charge of the military hospital in Moscow. He died in Moscow on 16 April 1832.

From 1794 to 1803 he published Tabulae anatomicae, which was a masterpiece containing a complete collection of anatomical illustrations of the human body. The work was one of the largest and most comprehensive anatomical atlases in its time. During his career, Loder maintained ongoing friendships with Christoph Wilhelm Hufeland and Johann Wolfgang von Goethe, both of whom had taken anatomy classes from Loder.

== Works ==
- Anatomisches Handbuch, volume 1, 1788 (second edition- 1800).
- Anfangsgründe der chirurgischen Anthropologie und der Staatsarzneikunde, 1791 (third edition- 1800, (Rudiments of surgical anthropology and the state pharmacology).
- Chirurgisch-medicinische Beobachtungen, mehrentheils in der herzogl. Saxon-Weimar Krankenanstalt zu Jena gesammelt, volume 1- 1794.
- Tabulae anatomicae quas ad illustrandam humani corporis fabricam, (1794–1803).
- Grundriß der Anatomie des menschlichen Körpers. Zum Gebrauche bei Vorlesungen und Secir-Uebungen, volume 1- 1806 (Outline the anatomy of the human body; for use in lectures and exercises, dissections).
- Elementa anatomiae humani corporis, 1823.
- Index praeparatorum aliarumque rerum ad anatomen spectantium, quae in museo Caes. Universitatis Mosquensis servantur, 1823 (second edition- 1826).
