= Ficken =

Ficken is a surname. Notable people with the surname include:

- Dieter Ficken, German U.S. soccer player
- Gene Ficken, Democratic politician
- Katherine Cutler Ficken, American architect
- Millicent S. Ficken, American ornithologist
- Sam Ficken, American football player

== See also ==
- Fick
