= Adolf Eugen Fick =

German physicist and physiologist (1829–1901)

Adolf Fick
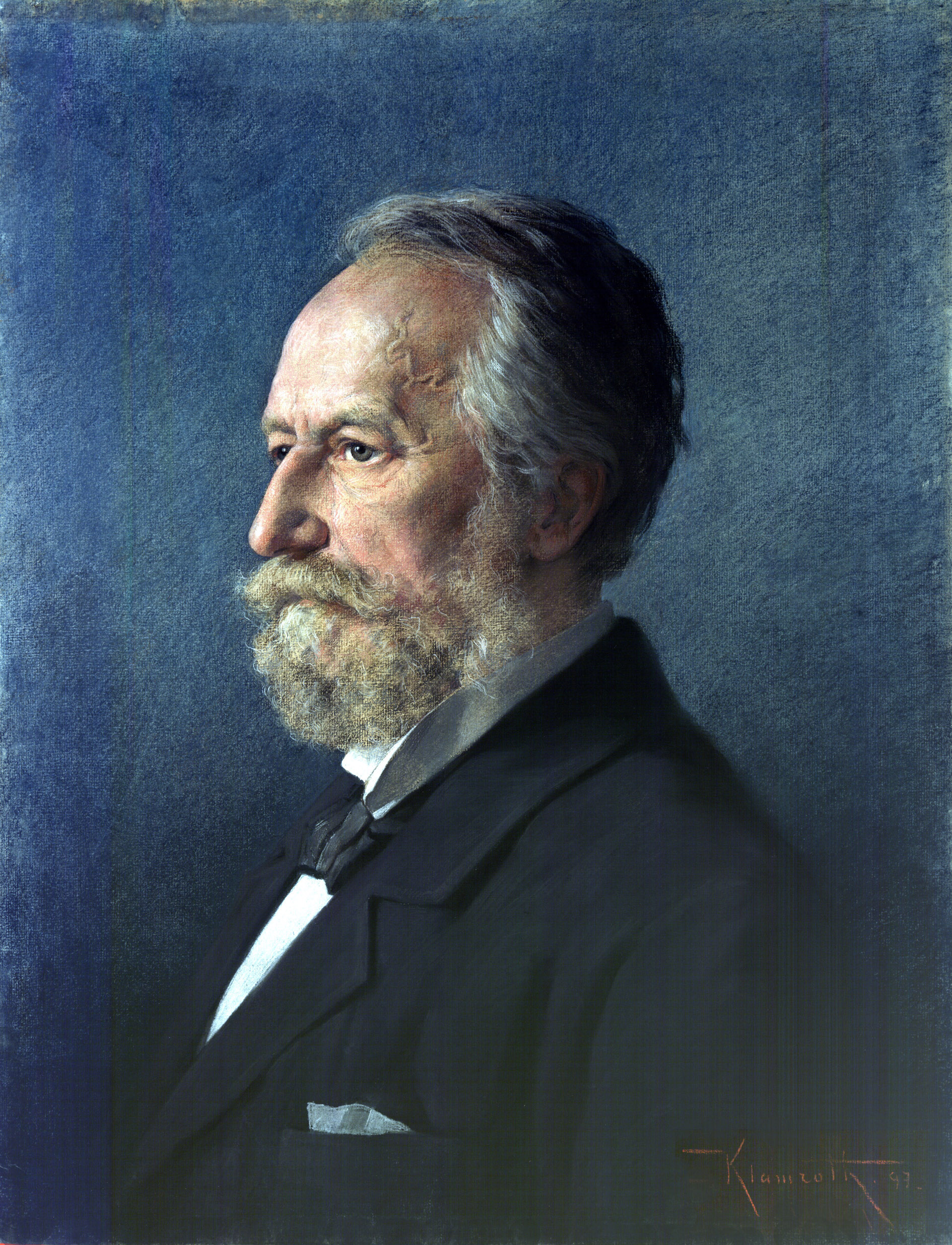
- Adolf Fick (1829–1901)
- Born: 3 September 1829; Kassel, Electorate of Hesse
- Died: 21 August 1901 (aged 71); Blankenberge, Flanders, Belgium
- Education: University of Marburg
- Known for: Fick's laws of diffusion Fick principle Imbert–Fick law
- Scientific career
- Fields: Physiology; Biophysics
- Workplaces: University of Zurich; University of Würzburg
- Thesis: Tractatur de errore optico quodam asymetria bulbi oculi effecto (1851)
- Doctoral advisor: Franz Ludwig Fick
- Doctoral students: Johann Jakob Müller, Max Dessoir

Notes
- He is the brother of Franz Ludwig Fick. He is the uncle of Adolf Gaston Eugen Fick who invented the contact lens.

Adolf Eugen Fick (3 September 1829 – 21 August 1901) was a German-born physician and physiologist.

== Early life and education ==
Fick began his work in the formal study of mathematics and physics before realising an aptitude for medicine. He then earned his doctorate in medicine from the University of Marburg in 1851. As a fresh medical graduate, he began his work as a prosector. He died in Flanders at age 71.

== Career ==
In 1855, he introduced Fick's laws of diffusion, which govern the diffusion of a gas across a fluid membrane. In 1870, he was the first to measure cardiac output, using what is now called the Fick principle.

Fick managed to double-publish his law of diffusion, as it applied equally to physiology and physics. His work led to the development of the direct Fick method for measuring cardiac output.

== Anecdotal ==
Fick's nephew, Adolf Gaston Eugen Fick, invented the contact lens.
