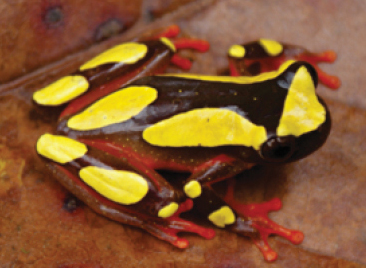
- Amapá, Brazil

Conservation status
- Least Concern (IUCN 3.1)

Scientific classification
- Kingdom: Animalia
- Phylum: Chordata
- Class: Amphibia
- Order: Anura
- Family: Hylidae
- Genus: Dendropsophus
- Species: D. leucophyllatus

Binomial name
- Dendropsophus leucophyllatus (Beireis, 1783)

Synonyms
- Hyla favosa Cope, 1886

= Dendropsophus leucophyllatus =

Species of amphibian

Dendropsophus leucophyllatus (common names: Beireis' treefrog, also white-leaf frog and clown treefrog) is a species of frog in the family Hylidae. It is found in the Amazon Basin (Bolivia, Brazil, Colombia, Ecuador, French Guiana, Guyana, Peru, Suriname, and possibly Venezuela).

This widespread and locally common species is found near water in a wide variety of tropical habitats. There are no known significant threats to this species.

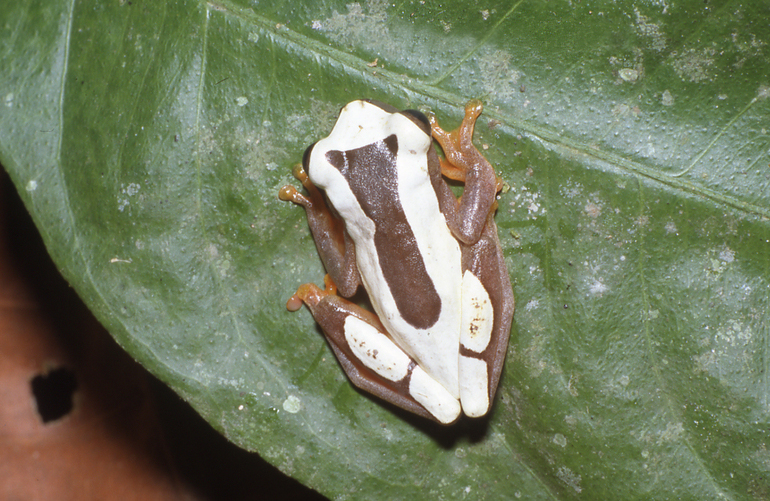

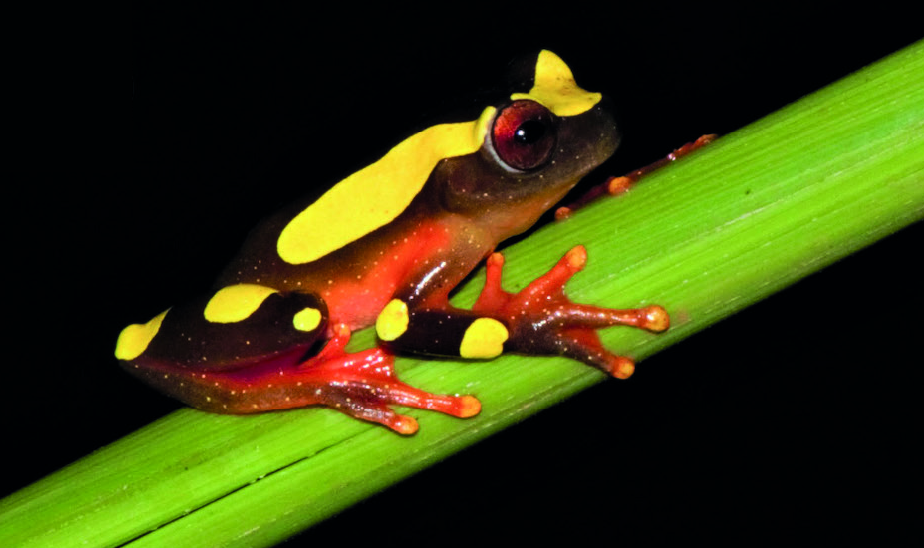
Amapá, Brazil
