= Goldmann Applanation Tonometer =

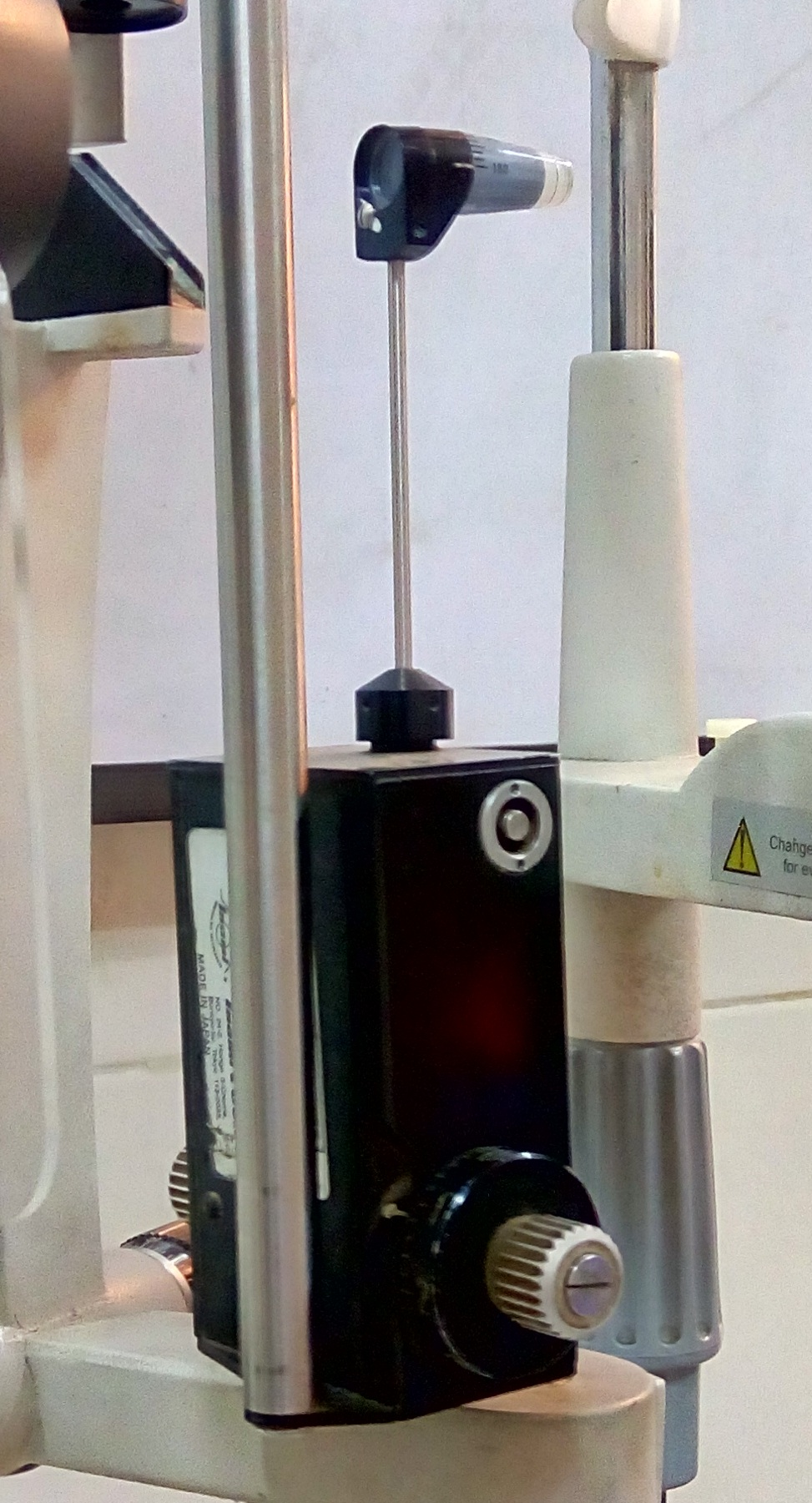
Goldmann Applanation Tonometer attached with Slit lamp biomicroscope

Goldmann Applanation Tonometer is an instrument that is based on Imbert-Fick law. It is considered to be the gold standard instrument for measurement of Intraocular pressure (IOP).

== Etymology ==
It was named after Austrian-Swiss ophthalmologist Hans Goldmann (1899–1991) in 1950.

== Principles ==
Goldmann applanation tonometer is based on the Imbert–Fick principle, which states that for a dry thin-walled sphere, the pressure (P) inside the sphere equals the force (F) necessary to flatten its surface divided by the area (A) of flattening (i.e. P = F/A). It applies to surfaces which are perfectly spherical, dry, flexible, elastic and infinitely thin. Theoretically, average corneal rigidity (taken as 520 μm for GAT) and the capillary attraction of the tear meniscus cancel each other out when the flattened area has the 3.06 mm diameter contact surface of the Goldmann prism, which is applied to the cornea using the Goldmann tonometer with a measurable amount of force from which the IOP is deduced.
