= Alfred Kleiner =

Swiss physicist (1849–1916)

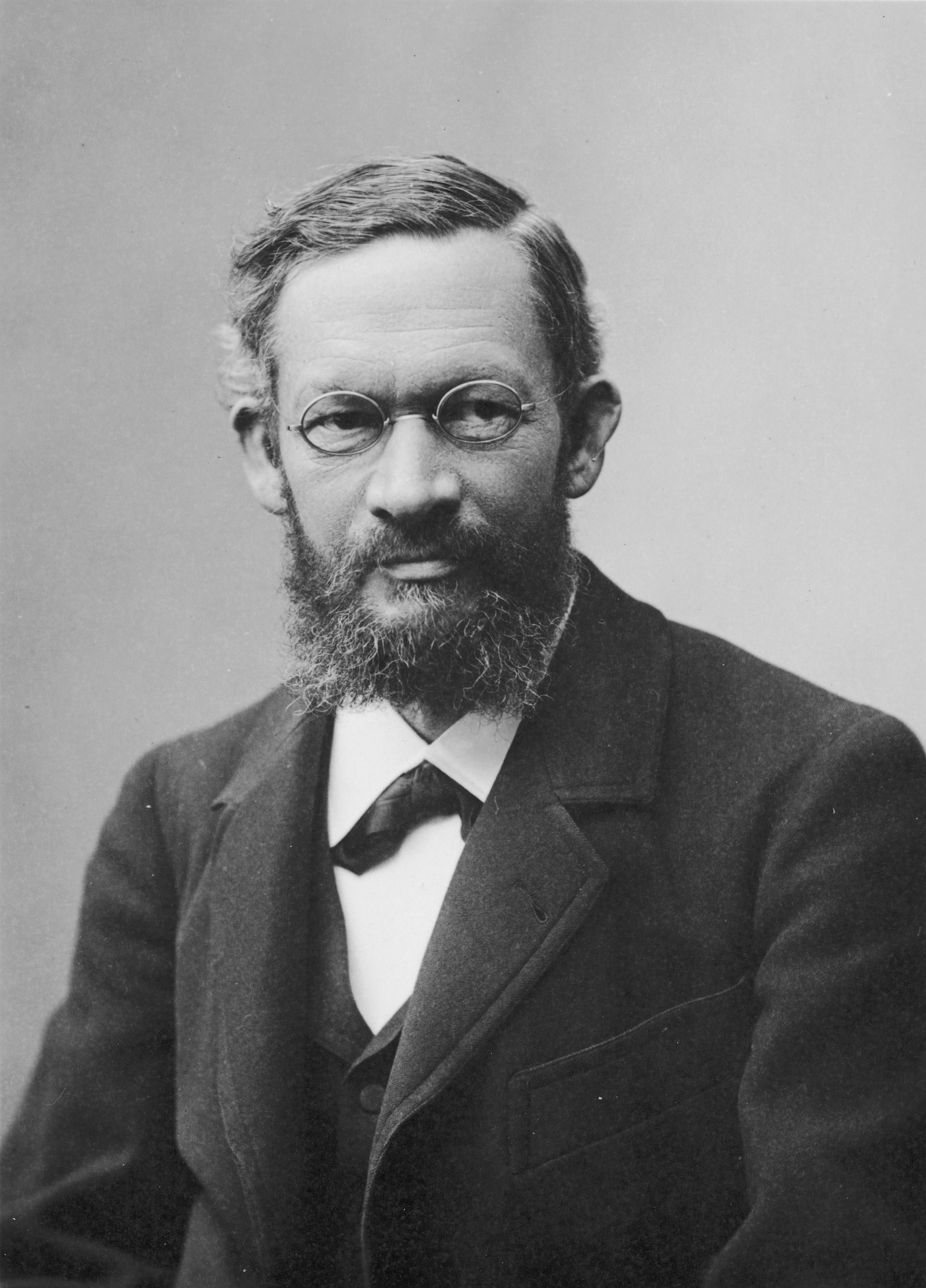
- Born: 24 April 1849; Maschwanden, Zurich, Switzerland
- Died: 3 July 1916 (aged 67)
- Education: University of Zurich
- Scientific career
- Fields: Statistical physics
- Workplaces: University of Zurich
- Thesis: Zur Theorie der intermittirenden Netzhautreizung (1874)
- Doctoral advisor: Johann Jakob Müller
- Doctoral students: Albert Einstein
- Other notable students: Fritz Laager; Theodor Erismann

Alfred Kleiner (24 April 1849 – 3 July 1916) was a Swiss physicist and Professor of Experimental Physics at the University of Zurich. He was Albert Einstein's doctoral advisor or Doktorvater. Initially Einstein's advisor was Heinrich F. Weber. However, they had a major falling out, and Einstein chose to switch to Kleiner.

== Education ==
He received his PhD in 1874 from the University of Zurich, for a thesis entitled Zur Theorie der intermittirenden Netzhautreizung (On the Theory of Intermittent Retinal Stimulation), under Johann Jakob Müller.

== Career ==
Alfred Kleiner was professor of physics at the University of Zurich. He also held several other positions and titles throughout his career, including: Privatdozent (private lecturer) in 1870, Außerordentlicher Professor (Associate Professor) in 1880, Ordentlicher Professor (Full Professor) in 1885, Rektor (Chancellor) from 1908 to 1910, Honorarprofessor (Emeritus Professor) in 1915, and Privatdozent from 1875 to 1885 at the Swiss Federal Institute of Technology, also called Eidgenössische Technische Hochschule Zürich or ETH (the "Polytechnikum", also at Zurich).

In the early 1890s, with his students Fritz Laager and Theordor Erismann, Kleiner conducted experiments to determine if changes in gravitational attraction could be caused by shielding. No effect greater than the experimental error was observed. Kleiner published his results on this in 1905, Laager in 1904, and Erismann in 1908 and 1911. Their work on this was motivated by the papers by Louis Winslow Austin and Charles Burton Thwing.

== Einstein and Kleiner ==
Einstein's controversy with Paul Drude took place in the middle of 1901. It was at this time that Einstein transitioned from Weber to Kleiner and changed his dissertation topic from thermoelectricity to molecular kinetics.

Until 1909 the ETH was not authorized to grant doctoral degrees, so a special arrangement enabled ETH students to obtain doctorates from the University of Zurich. At that time, most dissertations in physics by ETH students were carried out under the supervision of H.F. Weber, Einstein's former teacher at the Polytechnikum, as it was then called. The University of Zurich had only one physics chair, held by Alfred Kleiner. His main research was focused on measuring instruments, but he also had an interest in the foundations of physics.

In letters to Mileva Maric, Einstein noted the frequent discussions that he had with Kleiner on a wide range of topics. On 19 December 1901, Einstein writes to Marić that he had:

spent the whole afternoon with Kleiner in Zurich and explained my ideas on the electrodynamics of moving bodies to him. ...He advised me to publish my ideas about the electromagnetic theory of light for moving bodies together with the experimental method. He found the experimental method proposed by me to be the simplest and most appropriate one conceivable. ... I shall most certainly write the paper in the coming weeks.

Einstein also showed Kleiner his first PhD thesis dissertation in November 1901. However, Einstein withdrew his dissertation in February 1902. One year later he considered giving up his plan to obtain a doctorate and noted to his friend Michele Besso that "the whole comedy has become tiresome for me."

By March 1903 Einstein had changed his mind. Indeed, a letter to Besso contains some of the central ideas of the 1905 dissertation. Kleiner was, of course, one of the two faculty reviewers of the dissertation, submitted by Einstein to the University on 20 July 1905. Kleiner's judgement of the dissertation was very positive: "the arguments and calculations to be carried out are among the most difficult in hydrodynamics." The other reviewer, Heinrich Burkhardt, Professor for Mathematics at the university, added: "the mode of treatment demonstrates fundamental mastery of the relevant mathematical methods."

In his biography of Einstein, Carl Seelig reports: "Einstein later laughingly recounted that his dissertation was first returned by Kleiner with the comment that it was too short. After he had added a single sentence, it was accepted without further comment."

Einstein's earlier statistical physics papers (from 1902 to 1904) developed the foundations of a theoretical approach that he applied to concrete problems in 1905 and in subsequent years. His approach combined skepticism about classical mechanics with a firm belief in molecules and a confidence in statistical principles. However, Einstein's PhD thesis does not follow this statistical approach. It has been argued that Einstein avoided his own theoretical ideas to win Kleiner's approval.

In 1905 Einstein obtained his doctorate from the University of Zurich under Alfred Kleiner, with the thesis entitled Eine neue Bestimmung der Moleküldimensionen (A New Determination of the Molecular Dimensions). After Einstein concluded a 1909 lecture at the University of Zurich on electrodynamics and relativity, Alfred Kleiner suggested the possibility of a position at the university to Einstein and recommended him for a newly created professorship in theoretical physics. On 7 May 1909 the Regierungsrat des Kantons Zürich appointed Einstein as an associate professor, effective from 15 October 1909, with a salary of 4,500 Swiss Francs per annum.
