= Christian Heinrich Bünger =

German anatomist (1782–1842)

Christian Bünger
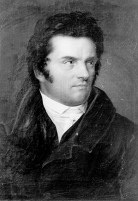
- Born: 11 October 1782; Braunschweig
- Died: 8 December 1842 (aged 60); Marburg
- Education: University of Helmstedt
- Known for: Rhinoplasty
- Scientific career
- Fields: Anatomist and surgeon
- Workplaces: University of Marburg
- Doctoral advisor: Justus Christian Loder; Gottfried Christoph Beireis
- Doctoral students: Franz Ludwig Fick

Christian Heinrich Bünger (11 October 1782 – 8 December 1842) was professor of anatomy and was the first surgeon to introduce rhinoplasty.

== Education ==
He received his MD in c. 1805 from the University of Helmstedt under Justus Ferdinand Christian Loder and Gottfried Christoph Beireis.

== Career ==
Bünger was professor of anatomy at the University of Marburg. He was an expert and innovator in operations on the nerve, lymph, and arterial systems, especially arterial ligations. He was the first to work out the exact natural positions of the auditory apparatus of animals and humans. Bünger was also a specialist in plastic surgery, especially of the nose and eyelids. He was the first to introduce rhinoplasty. In 1817 Bünger performed the first full thickness Skin grafting.

== Sources ==
- Jasper Hein, Christian Heinrich Bünger 1782-1842 Anatom und Chirurg in Marburg, Brosch., Einband lt. fleckig, sonst gt. Zustand., 467 S. Zur Geschichte der Anatomie und Chirurgie. Zahlr. Abb., Tabellen, Faksimile, Mannheim, 1976.
- Biographisches Lexikon der hervorragenden Ärzte, Urban & Schwarzenberg, 1962, vol. 1, pp. 758–759.
- Allgemeine Deutsche Biographie, Duncker & Humblot, 1967-1971 Reprint, vol. 3, p. 540.
- Neuer Nekrolog der Deutschen, 1842, vol. 20(part2), pp. 836–839.
