= Schiøtz tonometer =

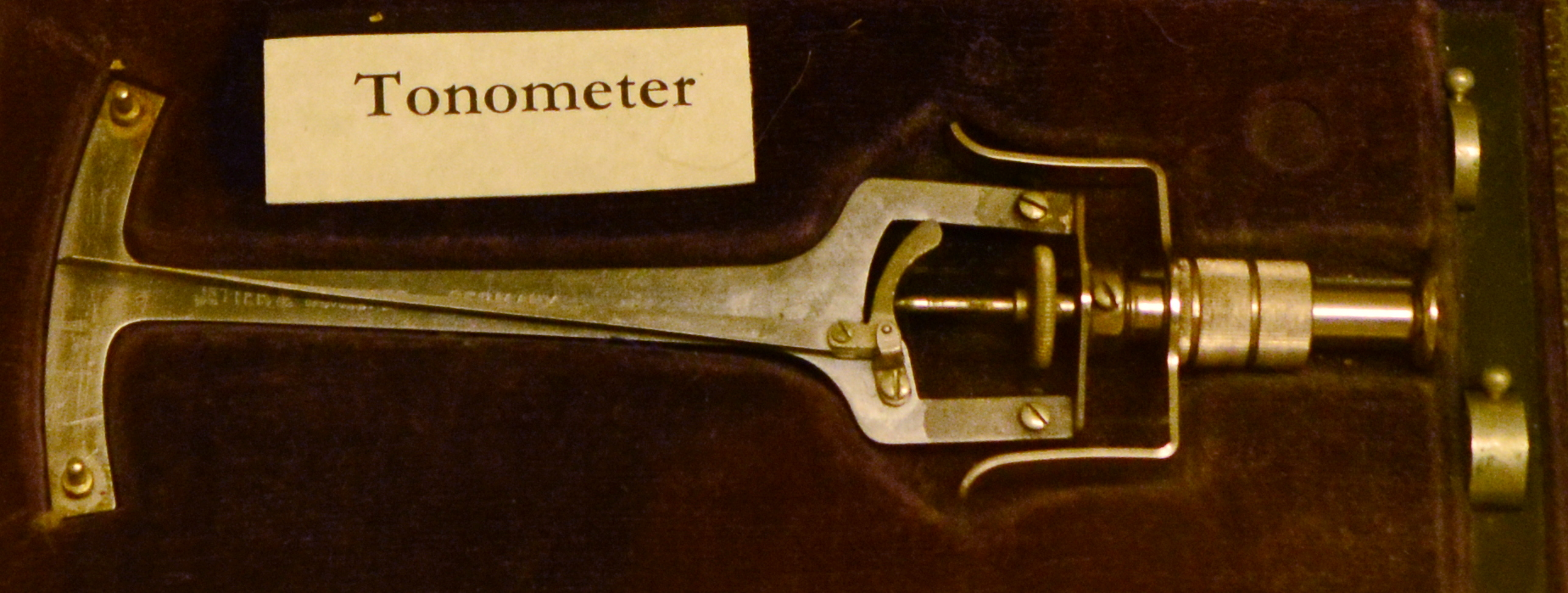
- Purpose: measure intra ocular pressure

Schiøtz tonometer is an indentation tonometer, used to measure the intraocular pressure (IOP) by measuring the depth produced on the surface of the cornea by a load of a known weight. The indentation of corneal surface is related to the IOP.

== Parts ==
The Schiotz tonometer consists of a curved footplate which is placed on the cornea of a supine patient. A weighted plunger attached to the footplate sinks into the cornea. A scale then gives a reading depending on how much the plunger sinks into the cornea, and a conversion table converts the scale reading into IOP measured in mmHg.

Footplates have to be cool, dry and sterilized before use.

== Eponym ==
It was invented by the Norwegian ophthalmologist Hjalmar August Schiøtz, who presented it to the Norwegian Medical Society on 10 May 1905.
