= Johann Jakob Müller =

Swiss physiologist and physicist

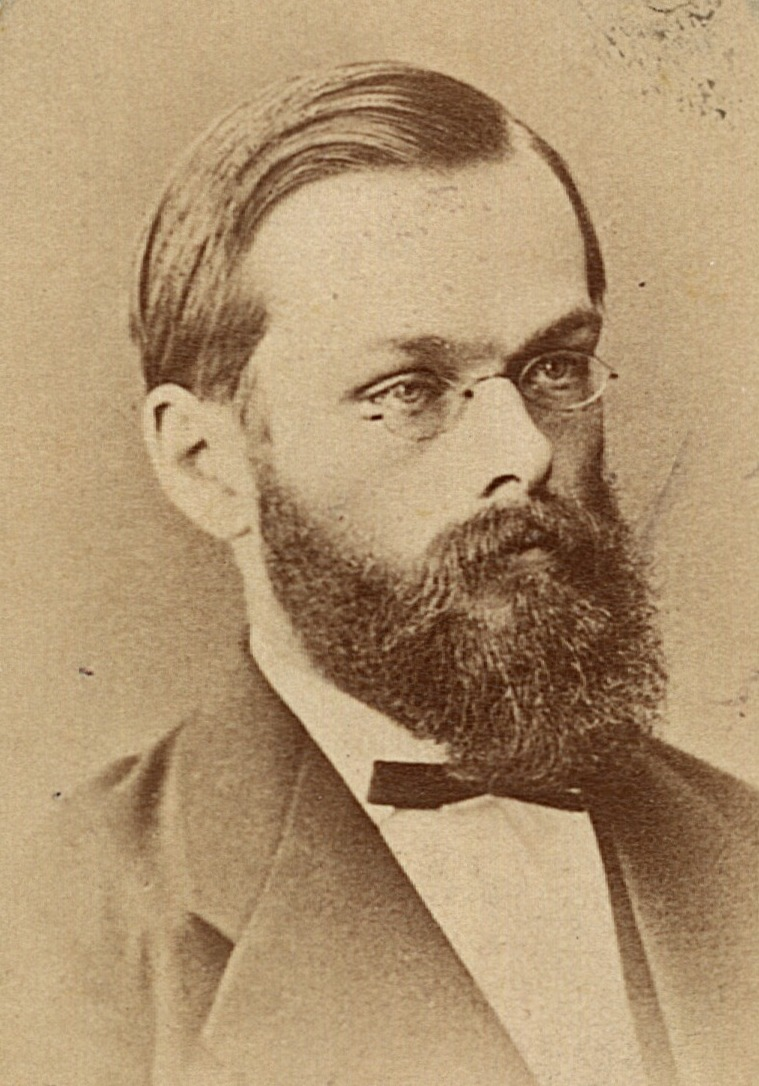
- Johann Jakob Müller
- Born: 4 March 1846; Seen, Winterthur, Switzerland
- Died: 14 January 1875 (aged 28); Zurich, Switzerland
- Education: University of Zurich
- Scientific career
- Fields: Physiologist and physicist
- Workplaces: University of Zurich
- Doctoral advisor: Adolf Fick
- Doctoral students: Alfred Kleiner

Johann Jakob Müller (4 March 1846 – 14 January 1875) was a physiologist and physicist.

== Education ==
In 1868, he obtained his "Dr. med." degree from the University of Zurich, under Adolf Fick with a thesis entitled: Untersuchungen über den Drehpunkt des menschlichen Auges (Investigations into the pivot point of the human eye). As part of these studies he variously studied in the University of Zurich, University of Leipzig, and University of Heidelberg.

== Career ==
In Leipzig, 1870, he became a dozent (lecturer) in physiology. In 1871 he became a professor in physics at the polytechnic institute in Zurich.
