= Lycée Vaucanson (Tours) =

Senior high school in France

Coordinates: 47.4236°N 0.7068°E

Lycée Jacques de Vaucanson is a senior high school/sixth-form college in Tours, Indre-et-Loire, France.

It opened in 1989 and moved into a new building in 2012.

The school includes a boarding facility.
