= Lycée Vaucanson (Grenoble) =

Senior high school in Grenoble, France

Coordinates: 45.1711°N 5.7079°E

Lycée Vaucanson is a senior high school/sixth-form college in Grenoble, France.

It originated from the Petit Séminaire du Rondeau, established in 1815, and the Ecole Supérieur, established in 1836. The institution took the name Ecole Professionnelle Vaucanson in 1876 in honor of the French inventor Jacques de Vaucanson.

As of 2015 the school had 1,100 students. It has a boarding facility.
