= Gottfried Christoph Beireis =

German chemist (1730–1809)

- Gottfried Christoph Beireis
- Born: 2 March 1730; Free imperial city of Mühlhausen, Holy Roman Empire
- Died: 18 September 1809 (aged 79); Helmstedt, Kingdom of Westphalia
- Education: University of Helmstedt
- Known for: Production of cinnabar red dye
- Scientific career
- Fields: Physicist, chemist, and physician
- Workplaces: University of Helmstedt
- Doctoral advisor: Lorenz Heister
- Other academic advisors: Georg Erhardt Hamberger
- Doctoral students: Christian Heinrich Bünger

Gottfried Christoph Beireis (2 March 1730 – 18 September 1809) was a German physicist, chemist, and physician. He was also a collector of curiosities who rescued some of Jacques de Vaucanson's automata.

== Biography ==
At the age of 20, the penniless Beireis began studying theology in Jena, but aspired to the encyclopedic knowledge of a polymath and studied physics, chemistry, and medicine under Georg Erhard Hamberger. At the age of 25, he had already written one of his few books, On the Usefulness and Indispensability of Natural History. From 1753 to 1756 he traveled and earned money through chemical inventions. At the age of 26, he began studying medicine at the University of Helmstedt under the famous doctor Lorenz Heister. He was so successful that, without having achieved his doctorate (which he received a few months later in 1762), he was appointed professor of physics (as successor to Johann Gottlob Krüger, who died in the same year) and second professor of chemistry in 1759. In 1801 he was elected an external member of the Göttingen Academy of Sciences. He taught numerous subjects in Helmstedt and was also given a third professorship in medicine as well as various titles such as "Hofrat" and in 1803 "Leibarztus" of the Duke of Brunswick and Lüneburg Karl Wilhelm Ferdinand.

Beireis remained active until old age. He was so busy with lectures and his medical practice that he published little. His keen mind, his knowledge and his lectures and, not least, his collection made him known far beyond Helmstedt's borders; even Goethe did not fail to visit him in 1805, accompanied by Friedrich August Wolf and his son August. The latter was impressed by Beireis' valuable collection. Ludwig Achim von Arnim visited him in 1806 and dedicated a chapter of his novel Poverty, Wealth, Guilt and Repentance of Countess Dolores to him. Beireis' outstanding skills as a doctor and chemist and the fact that he took money for medical diagnoses from rich people but sometimes treated the poor for free ensured a fulfilling professional life. However, his enormous hard work left Beireis no time to start a family and he had the reputation of being an eccentric.

His extensive knowledge of chemistry, which he also liked to show in lectures, earned him the reputation of an alchemist (he was called Magus von Helmstedt), which was how Beireis's wealth was explained. Beireis himself promoted this reputation through secrecy and insinuations (such as the possession of a large diamond, gold-making, travels to India, etc.) Therefore, the cultural historian Johannes Scherr described him as a "learned eccentric [...] who, among other things, claimed to own a diamond weighing 6400 carats that the Emperor of China had pawned with him". Beireis, however, refused to give chemistry or alchemy lessons to followers of the then influential Rosicrucians. He seems to have partly built his wealth on chemical inventions (dyes, vinegar production). His publications on chemistry mostly appeared in the Chemischen Annalen by Lorenz von Crell.

A song of thanks and a birthday poem for him from his time in Helmstedt have been preserved in the Beireis Apotheke in Helmstedt. They reflect how Beireis influenced and for the people of Helmstedt. Such an ode was also written for the fiftieth anniversary of his appointment as professor on May 29, 1809. Beireis collected rare and strange objects in a kind of art cabinet. Among them were also physical apparatus, the basis of which was the collection of the professor in Helmstedt Johann Andreas Schmidt, who died in 1726. The collection also included pictures from the Cranach workshop and Peter Paul Rubens and the famous mechanical apparatus by Jacques de Vaucanson (the duck, the flute player and a drummer), which he probably sold in its entirety to the French government in 1808 and which were estimated to have a total value of 800,000 livres. When dysentery raged in Helmstedt shortly afterwards, Beireis, who was almost 80 years old, was one of its victims. After a short illness, he died on September 18, 1809. He did not live to see the center of his life, the University of Helmstedt, closed in 1810 on the orders of Jérôme Bonaparte. The remains of his collection were auctioned after his death, except for the instruments that went to the university and are now partly preserved by the University of Braunschweig, including the Magdeburg hemispheres and an air pump owned by Otto von Guericke. The estate also included 100,000 thalers.
