= Imbert-Fick law =

Armand Imbert (1850–1922) and Adolf Fick (1829–1901) both demonstrated, independently of each other, that in ocular tonometry the tension of the wall can be neutralized when the application of the tonometer produces a flat surface instead of a convex one, and the reading of the tonometer (P) then equals (T) the IOP," whence all forces cancel each other.

== History ==
This principle was used by Hans Goldmann (1899–1991) who referred to it as the Imbert-Fick "law", thus giving his newly marketed tonometer (with the help of the Haag-Streit Company) a quasi-scientific basis; it is mentioned in the ophthalmic and optometric literature, but not in any books of physics. According to Goldmann, "The law states that the pressure in a sphere filled with liquid and surrounded by an infinitely thin membrane is measured by the counterpressure which just flattens the membrane." "The law presupposes that the membrane is without thickness and without rigidity...practically without any extensibility."

A sphere formed from an inelastic membrane and filled with incompressible liquid cannot be indented or applanated even when the pressure inside is zero, because a sphere contains the maximum volume with the minimum surface area. Any deformation necessarily increases surface area, which is impossible if the membrane is inelastic.

The physical basis of tonometry is Newton's third law of motion: "If you press an eyeball with an object, the object is also pressed by the eyeball."

The law is this:

Intraocular pressure = Contact force/Area of contact

The law assumes that the cornea is infinitely thin, perfectly elastic, and perfectly flexible. None of these assumptions are accurate. The cornea is a membrane that has thickness and offers resistance when pressed. Therefore, in Goldmann tonometry, readings are normally taken when an area of 3.06mm diameter has been flattened. At this point the opposing forces of corneal rigidity and the tear film are roughly approximate in a normal cornea and cancel each other out allowing the pressure in the eye to be inferred from the force applied.

== See also ==
- Eye examination
- Optometry
