= Adolf Gaston Eugen Fick =

German ophthalmologist (1852–1937)

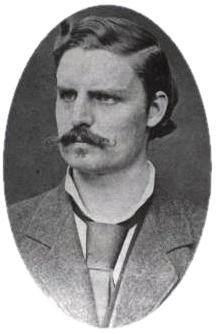
- Born: 22 February 1852; Marburg, Electorate of Hesse
- Died: 11 February 1937 (aged 84); Herrsching am Ammersee, Nazi Germany
- Known for: Inventor of contact lens

Adolf Gaston Eugen Fick (22 February 1852 – 11 February 1937) was a French-German ophthalmologist who invented the contact lens. He was the nephew of the German physiologist Adolf Eugen Fick, and the son of the German anatomy professor Franz Ludwig Fick.

When Fick was three years old, his mother died, and when he was six, his father, anatomy professor Ludwig Fick, died. Soon afterwards, he was raised in Adolf Fick's family. Adolf Fick was his uncle, godfather, and a famous physiologist, and influenced his nephew's studies in ophthalmology.

The younger Fick studied medicine in Würzburg, Zürich, Marburg, and Freiburg. In 1884, Fick traveled to Germany to marry Marie, the daughter of Johannes Wislicenus; he later had eight children with her.

In 1888, he constructed and fitted what was to be considered the first successful model of a contact lens: an afocal scleral contact shell made from heavy brown glass, which he tested first on rabbits, then on himself, and lastly on a small group of volunteers. It was considered the first successful model of a contact lens. His idea was advanced independently by several innovators in the years that followed.

During World War I, Fick headed field hospitals in France, Russia and Turkey. At the same time he continued working on ophthalmologic anatomy and optics.

== External links and sources ==
- Fick biography - The "Kontaktbrille" of Adolf Eugen Fick (1887)
- Fick biography - Contact Lens History, the overseas pioneers
