= Prosection =

Dissection of a cadaver to demonstrate anatomic structure

A prosection is the dissection of a cadaver (human or animal) or part of a cadaver by an experienced anatomist in order to demonstrate for students anatomic structure. In a dissection, students learn by doing; in a prosection, students learn by either observing a dissection being performed by an experienced anatomist or examining a specimen that has already been dissected by an experienced anatomist (etymology: Latin pro- "before" + sectio "a cutting").

A prosection may also refer to the dissected cadaver or cadaver part which is then reassembled and provided to students for review.

== Use in medicine ==
Prosections are used primarily in the teaching of anatomy in disciplines as varied as human medicine, chiropractic, veterinary medicine, and physical therapy. Prosections may also be used to teach surgical techniques (such as the suturing of skin), pathology, physiology, reproduction medicine and theriogenology, and other topics.

The use of the prosection teaching technique is somewhat controversial in medicine. In the teaching of veterinary medicine, the goal is to "create the best quality education ... while ensuring that animals are not used harmfully and that respect for animal life is engendered within the student." Others have concluded that dissections and prosections have a negative impact on students' respect for patients and human life. Some scholars argue that while actual hands-on experience is essential, alternatives such as plastinated or freeze-dried cadavers are just as effective in the teaching of anatomy while dramatically reducing the number of cadavers or cadaver parts needed. Other alternatives such as instructional videos, plastic models, and printed materials also exist. Some studies find them equally effective as dissection or prosections, and some schools of human medicine in the UK have abandoned the use of cadavers entirely. But others question the usefulness of these alternatives, arguing dissection or prosection of cadavers are required for in-depth learning and teach skills alternatives cannot. Some scholars and teachers go so far as to argue that cadavers and prosections are irreplaceable in the teaching of medicine.

Whether prosections are as effective as dissections in the teaching of medicine is also an unsettled aspect of medical education. Some have concluded that prosections are equally effective. However, others argue that the use of prosections is not as effective, and that dissections help students learn about "detached concern," better understand medical uncertainty, and allow teachers to raise moral issues about death and dying.

Some academics conclude that the effectiveness of prosections versus dissection or other alternatives depends on the type of anatomy or the discipline being taught (e.g., anatomy versus pathology), that the teaching of anatomy is yet insufficiently understood, and that existing studies are too narrow or limited to draw conclusions.
