= Fickert =

Fickert is a surname. Notable people with this surname include:

- Auguste Fickert (1855–1910), Austrian feminist
- Charles Fickert (1873–1937), American politician
- Christian Fickert (born 1981), German football player
- Joachim Fickert, German football coach
- Stephen Fickert, American football coach
