= Ocular tonometry =

Procedure to determine intra ocular pressure

Tonometry
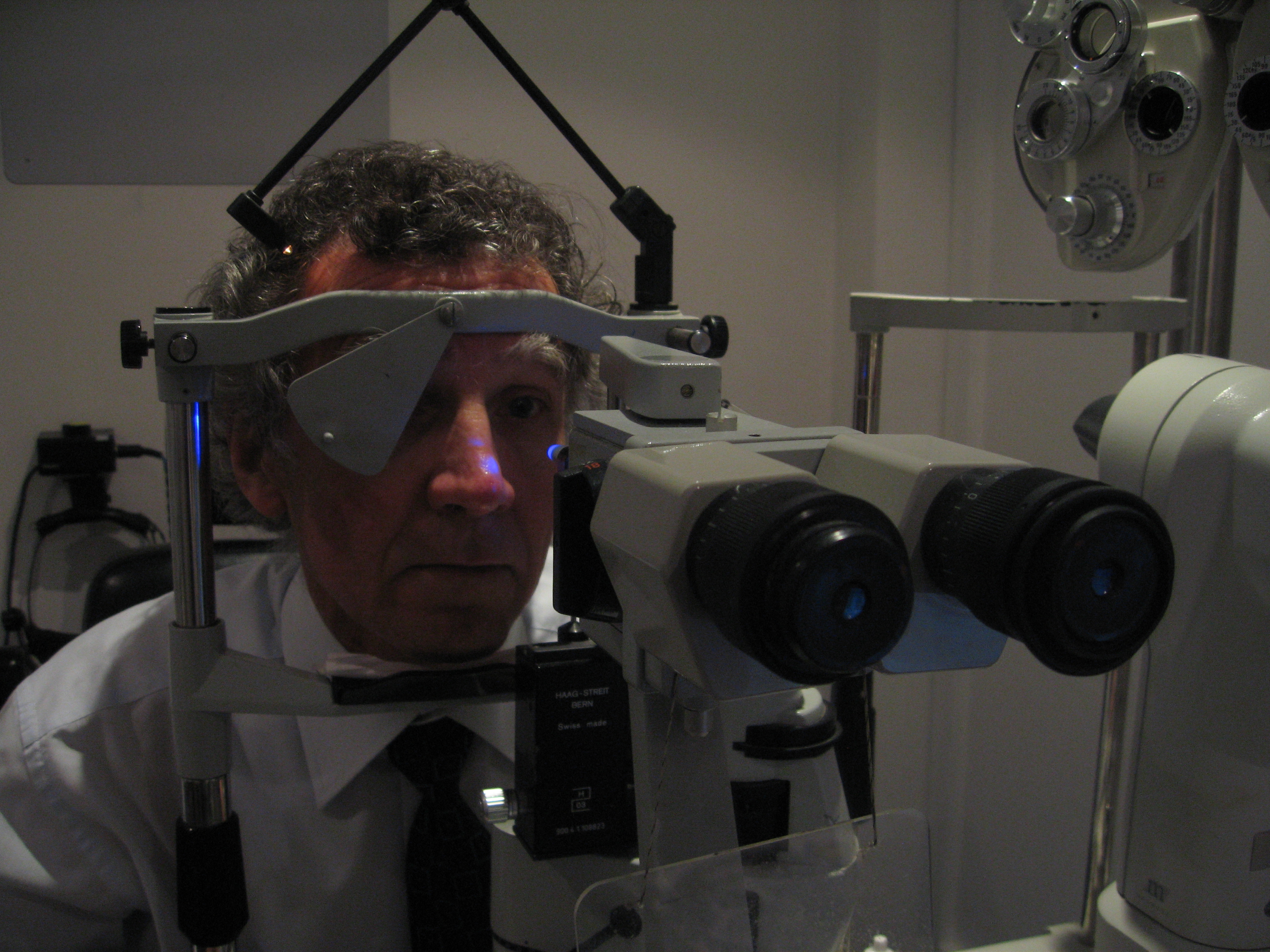
- A patient in front of a tonometer
- Specialty: Optometry
- ICD-9-CM: 89.11
- MeSH: D014065
- MedlinePlus: 003447

Tonometry is the procedure that eye care professionals perform to determine the intraocular pressure (IOP) of aqueous humor, the fluid pressure inside the eye. It is an important test in the evaluation of patients at risk from glaucoma. Most tonometers are calibrated to measure pressure in millimeters of mercury (mmHg), with the normal eye pressure range between 10 and 21 mmHg (13–28 hPa).

== Methods ==
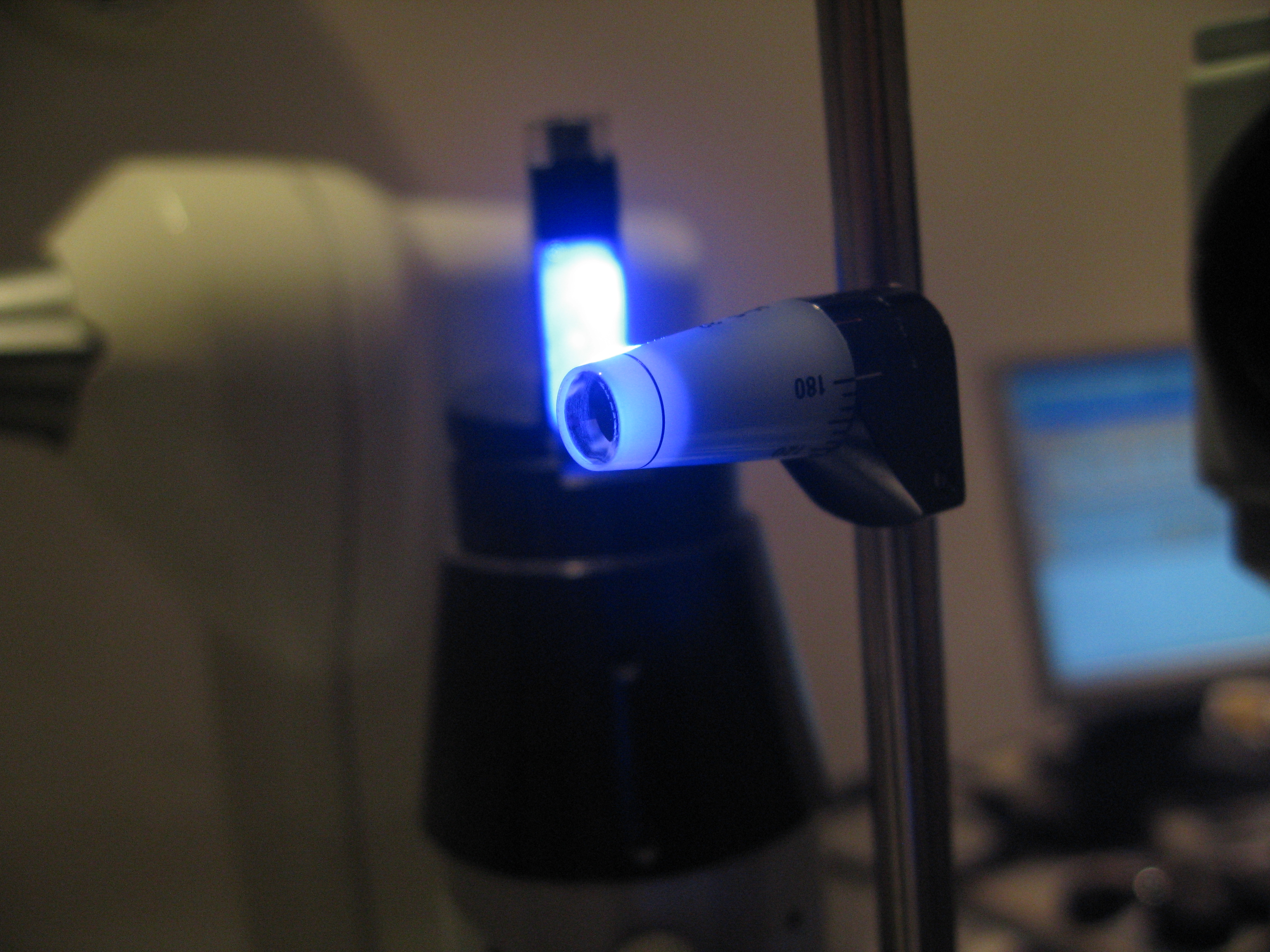
The slit lamp of a Goldmann tonometer

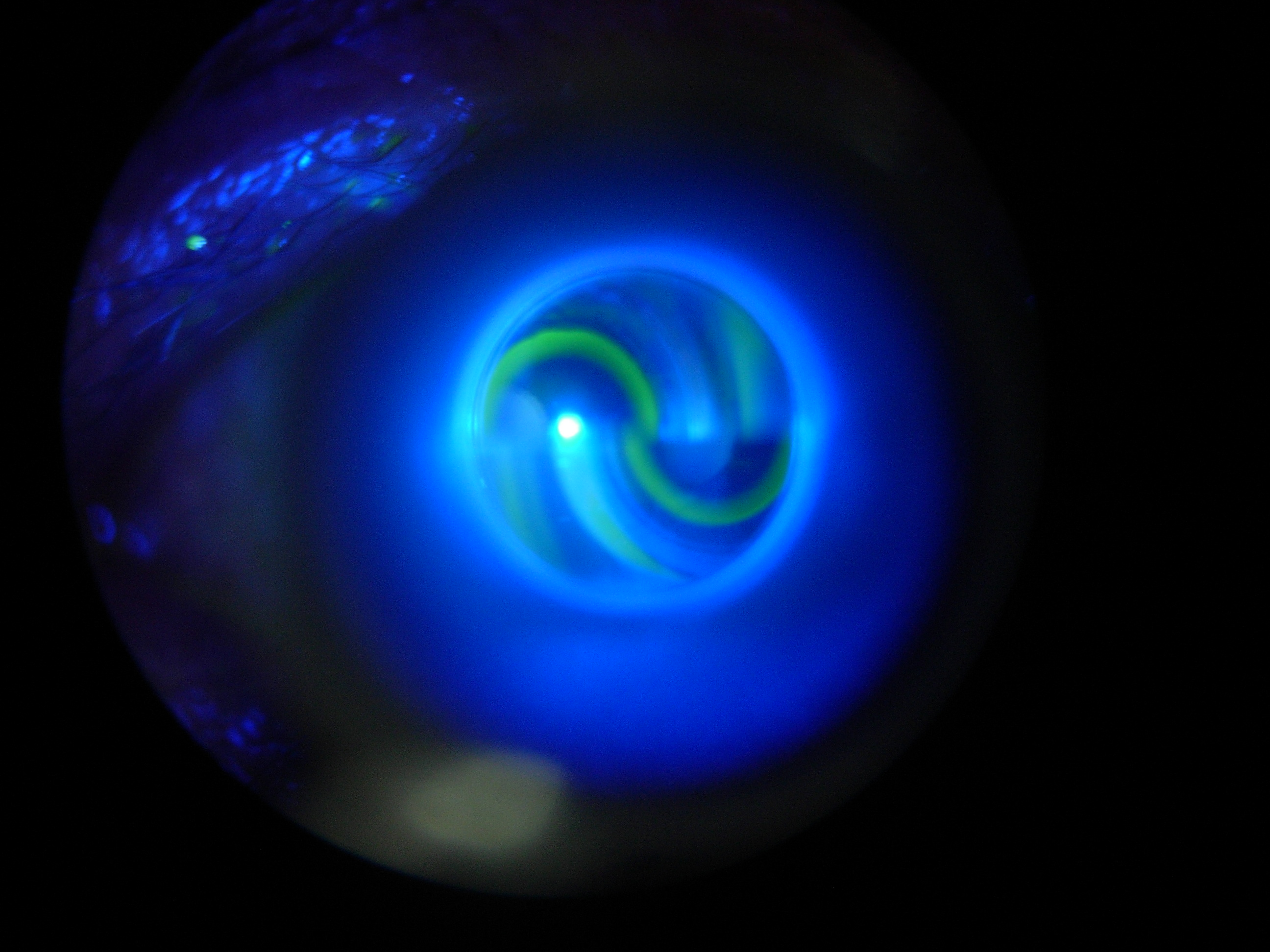
Semicircles seen during Goldmann tonometry through slit lamp

=== Applanation tonometry ===
In applanation tonometry the intraocular pressure (IOP) is inferred from the force required to flatten (applanate) a constant area of the cornea, for the Imbert-Fick law. The Maklakoff tonometer was an early example of this method, while the Goldmann tonometer is the most widely used version in current practice. Because the probe makes contact with the cornea, a topical anesthetic, such as proxymetacaine, is introduced on to the surface of the eye in the form of an eye drop.

==== Goldmann tonometry ====
Goldmann applanation tonometry (GAT) is considered to be the gold standard IOP test and is the most widely accepted method. A special disinfected prism is mounted on the tonometer head and then placed against the cornea. The examiner then uses a cobalt blue filter to view two green semicircles. The force applied to the tonometer head is then adjusted using a dial connected to a variable tension spring until the inner edges of the green semicircles in the viewfinder meet. When the area of a circle with diameter 3.06 mm (0.120 in) has been flattened, the opposing forces of corneal rigidity and the tear film are roughly approximate and cancel each other out allowing the pressure in the eye to be determined from the force applied. Like all non-invasive methods, it is inherently imprecise and may need to be adjusted.

==== Perkins tonometer ====
The Perkins tonometer is a type of portable applanation tonometer, which may be useful in children, anesthetised patients who need to lie flat, or patients unable to co-operate with a sitting slit lamp examination, that yields clinical results comparable to the Goldmann.

=== Dynamic contour tonometry ===
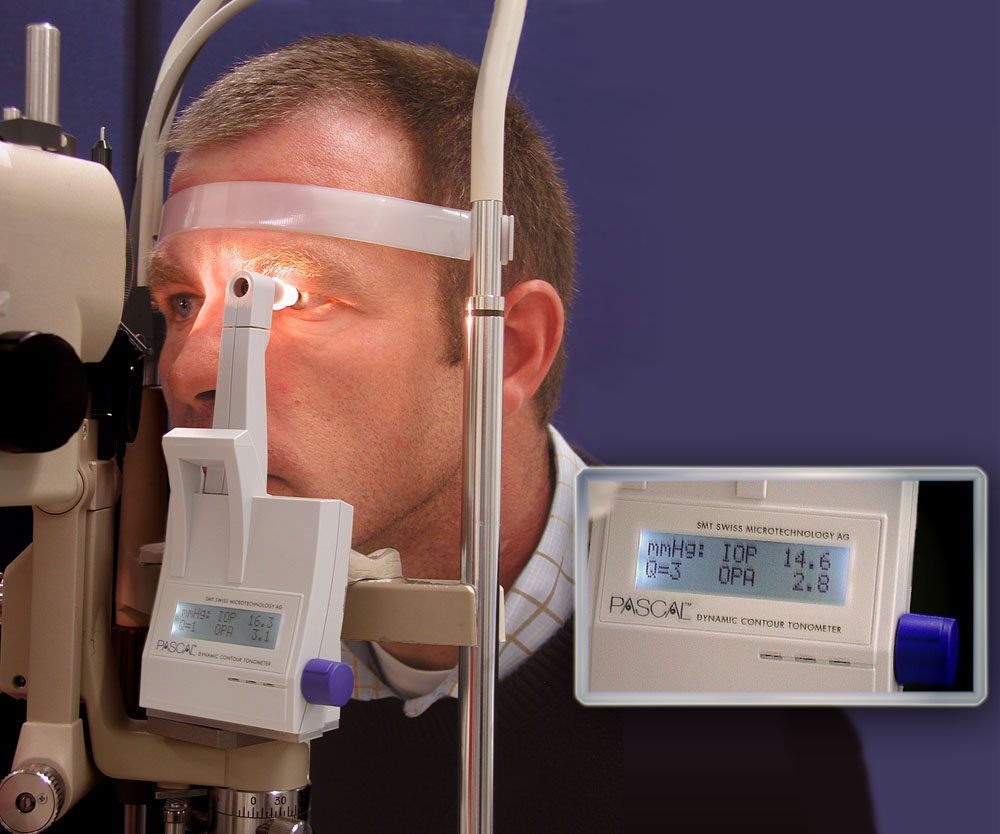
The PASCAL dynamic contour tonometer

Dynamic contour tonometry (DCT) uses the principle of contour matching instead of applanation. The tip contains a hollow the same shape as the cornea with a miniature pressure sensor in its centre. In contrast to applanation tonometry it is designed to avoid deforming the cornea during measurement and is therefore thought to be less influenced by corneal thickness and other biomechanical properties of the cornea than other methods but because the tip shape is designed for the shape of a normal cornea, it is more influenced by corneal curvature.

The probe is placed on the pre-corneal tear film on the central cornea (see gallery) and the integrated piezoresistive pressure sensor automatically begins to acquire data, measuring IOP 100 times per second. The tonometer tip rests on the cornea with a constant appositional force of one gram. When the sensor is subjected to a change in pressure, the electrical resistance is altered and the tonometer's computer calculates a change in pressure according to the change in resistance. A complete measurement cycle requires about eight seconds of contact time. The device also measures the variation in pressure that occurs with the cardiac cycle.

=== Electronic indentation tonometry ===
Electronic indentation tonometers are modified Mackay-Marg tonometers that use a free floating transducer to detect the transmitted pressure. The transducer is surrounded by an outer ring that flattens the adjacent cornea reducing its influence on measurement. Because the device touches the cornea, topical anesthetic eye drops are used to numb the eye but as with non-contact tonometry, these devices are often used in children and non-cooperative patients because of their portability and ease of use. Portable electronic tonometers also play a major role in veterinary tonometry.

=== Rebound tonometry ===
Rebound tonometers determine intraocular pressure by bouncing a small plastic tipped metal probe against the cornea. The device uses an induction coil to magnetise the probe and fire it against the cornea. As the probe bounces against the cornea and back into the device, it creates an induction current from which the intraocular pressure is calculated. The device is simple and easy to use and self-use versions are available. It is portable, does not require the use of eye drops and is particularly suitable for children and non-cooperative patients.

=== Pneumatonometry ===
A pneumatonometer utilizes a pneumatic sensor (consisting of a piston floating on an air bearing). Filtered air is pumped into the piston and travels through a small (5 mm (0.20 in) diameter) fenestrated membrane at one end. This membrane is placed against the cornea. The balance between the flow of air from the machine and the resistance to flow from the cornea affect the movement of the piston and this movement is used to calculate the intra-ocular pressure.

=== Impression tonometry ===
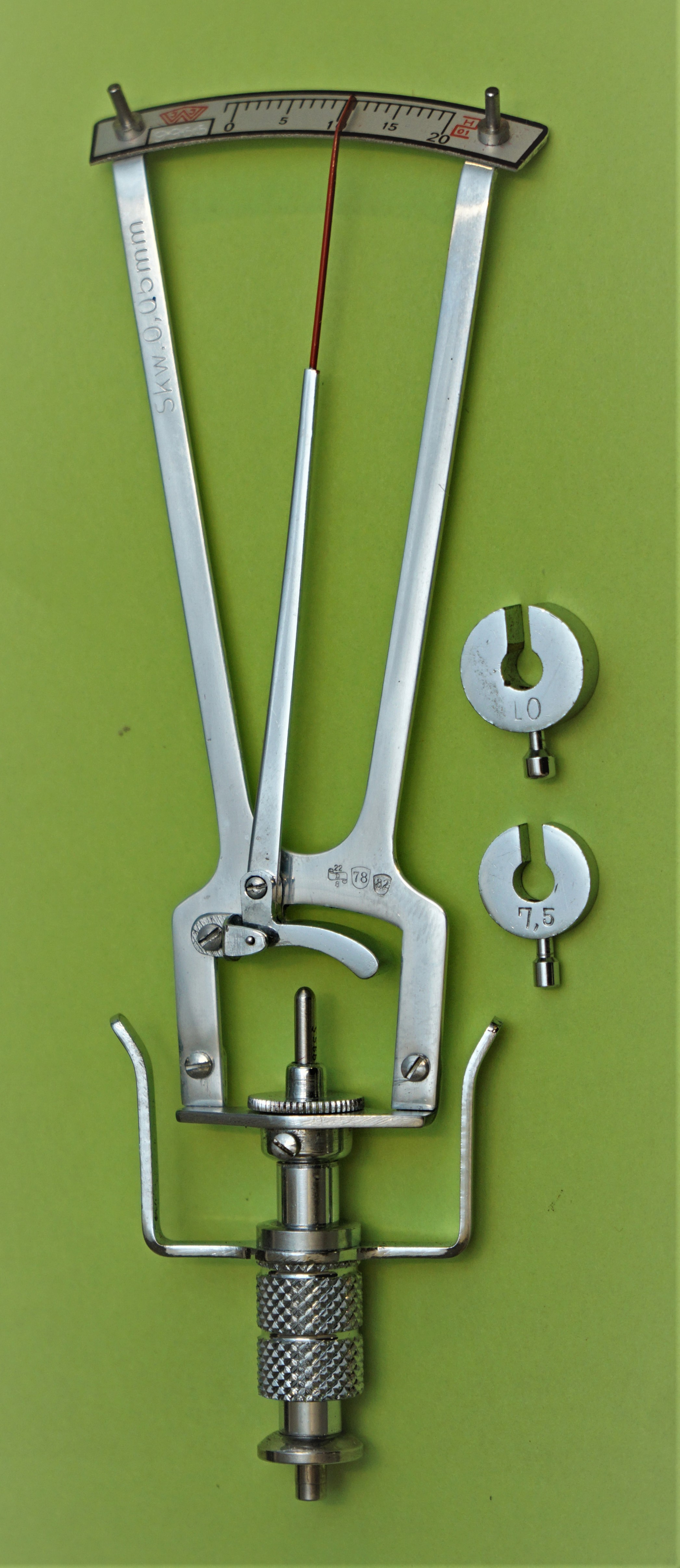
Schiøtz tonometer

Impression tonometry (also known as indentation tonometry) measures the depth of corneal indentation made by a small plunger carrying a known weight. The higher the intraocular pressure, the harder it is to push against and indent the cornea. For very high levels of IOP, extra weights can be added to make the plunger push harder. The movement of the plunger is measured using a calibrated scale. The Schiøtz tonometer is the most common device to use this principle.

=== Non-corneal and transpalpebral tonometry ===
Diaton transpalpebral tonometer

Transpalpebral tonometry refers to methods of measuring intraocular pressure through the eyelid. The Diaton non-corneal tonometer calculates pressure by measuring the response of a free-falling rod, as it rebounds against the tarsal plate of the eyelid through the sclera. The patient is positioned so that the tip of the device and lid are overlying sclera. Non-corneal and transpalpebral tonometry does not involve contact with the cornea and does not require topical anesthetic during routine use. Transpalpebral tonometry may be useful for measuring postsurgery IOP after myopic LASIK ablation because this technique is not influenced by the treatment. The Diaton tonometer still requires further evaluation and is not a substitute or alternative for more established methods. The Diaton tonometer has a large margin of error compared with commonly used tonometers (e.g., GAT) in most patients (including those with ocular hypertension, glaucoma, and glaucoma tube shunts).

=== Non-contact tonometry ===
Non-contact tonometry (or air-puff tonometry) is different from pneumatonometry and was invented by Bernard Grolman of Reichert, Inc (formerly American Optical). It uses a rapid air pulse to applanate (flatten) the cornea. Corneal applanation is detected via an electro-optical system. Intraocular pressure is estimated by detecting the force of the air jet at the instance of applanation. Historically, non-contact tonometers were not considered to be an accurate way to measure IOP but instead a fast and simple way to screen for high IOP. However, modern non-contact tonometers have been shown to correlate well with Goldmann tonometry measurements and are particularly useful for measuring IOP in children and other non-compliant patient groups.

==== Ocular response analyzer ====
The ocular response analyser (ORA) is a non-contact (air puff) tonometer that does not require topical anaesthesia and provides additional information on the biomechanical properties of the cornea. It uses an air pulse to deform the cornea into a slight concavity. The difference between the pressures at which the cornea flattens inward and outward is measured by the machine and termed corneal hysteresis (CH). The machine uses this value to correct for the effects of the cornea on measurement.

=== Reader Tonometry (Palpation) ===
Palpation is the method of estimating intraocular pressure by gently pressing the index finger against the cornea of a closed eye. This method is notoriously unreliable, but can be helpful in estimating the probability of raised IOP in emergency situations.

== Influencing factors ==
=== Central corneal thickness (CCT) ===
The thickness of the cornea affects most non-invasive methods by varying resistance to the tonometer probe. A thick cornea gives rise to a greater probability of an IOP being overestimated (and a thin cornea of an IOP being underestimated), but the extent of measurement error in individual patients cannot be ascertained from the CCT alone. The Ocular Response Analyzer and Pascal DCT Tonometers are less affected by CCT than the Goldmann tonometer. Conversely, non-contact and rebound tonometers are more affected. Corneal thickness varies among individuals as well as with age and race. It is reduced in certain disease and following LASIK surgery.

== Gallery ==
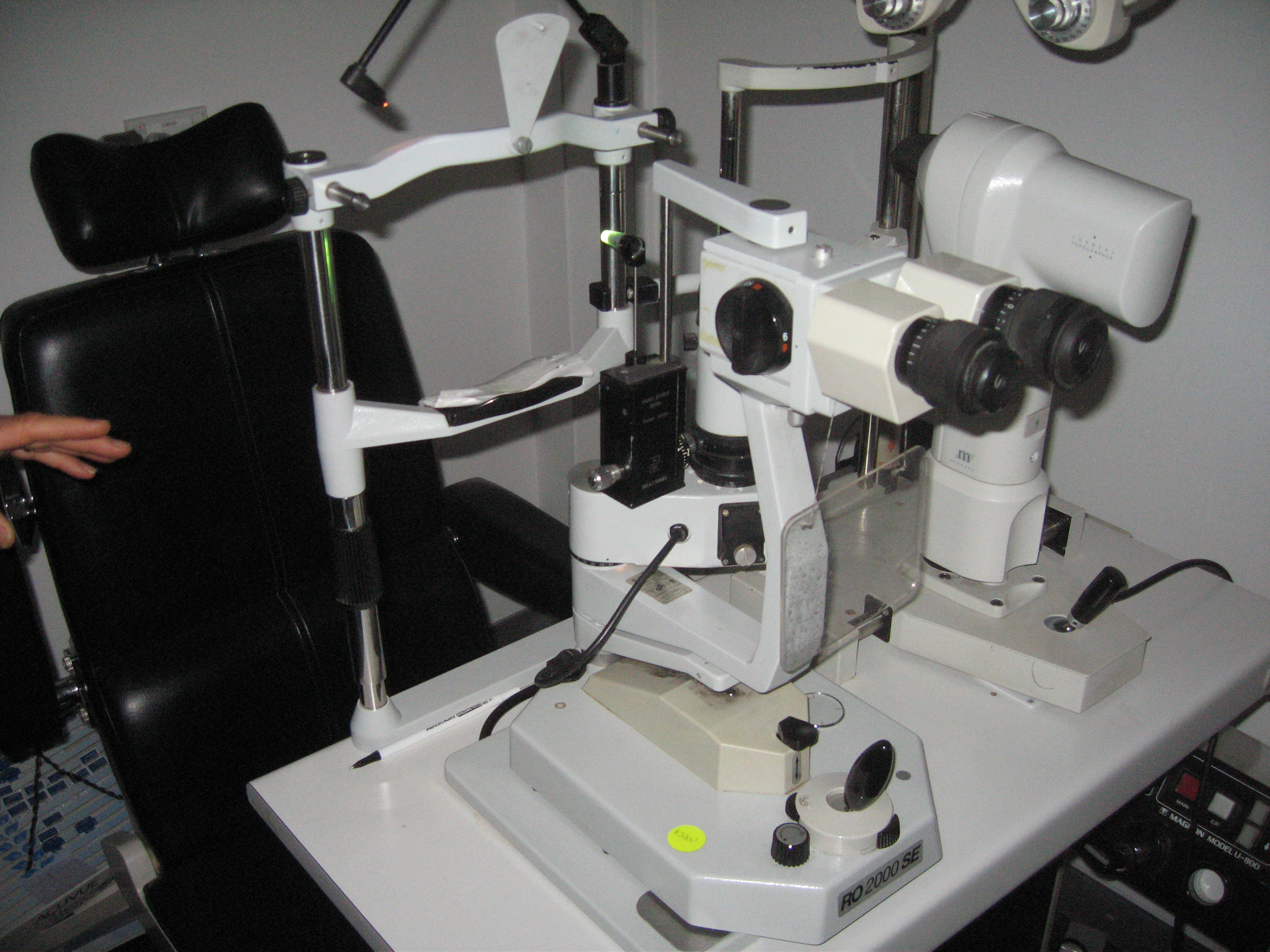
A Goldmann tonometer

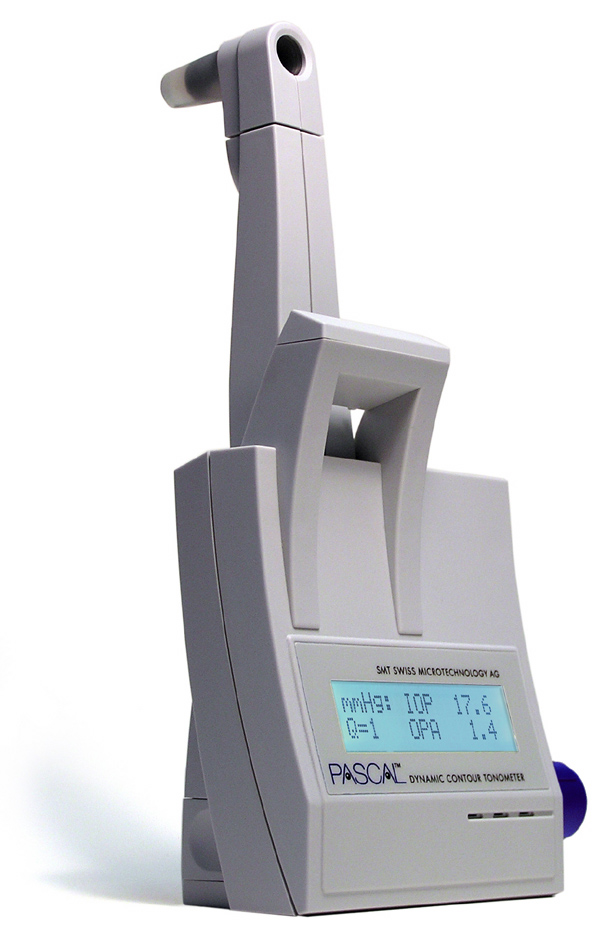
PASCAL dynamic contour tonometer

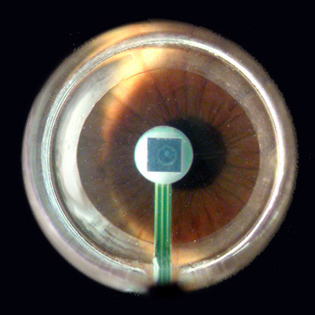
SensorTip of a PASCAL tonometer in contact with patient's cornea
