= Jacques de Vaucanson =

French inventor and artist (1709–1782)

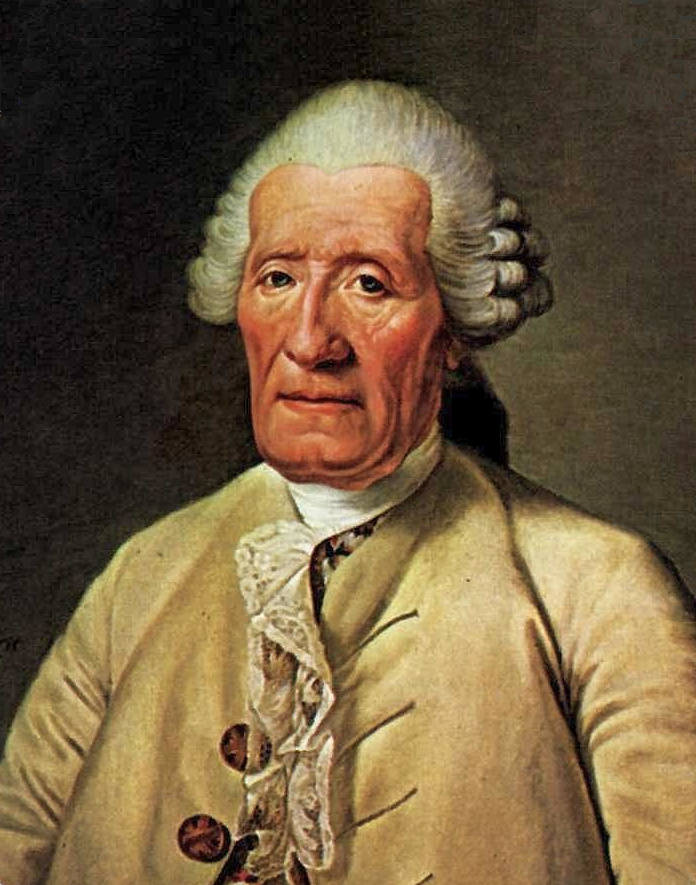
- Portrait by Joseph Boze, c. 1784
- Born: Jacques Vaucanson; February 24, 1709; Grenoble, France
- Died: November 21, 1782 (aged 73); Paris, France
- Education: Jesuit school in Grenoble (now Lycée Stendhal)
- Occupations: Inventor; artist
- Known for: Building the first all-metal lathe; Designing the first automatic loom; Automata
- Spouse: Madeleine Rey
- Children: Angélique Victoire de Vaucanson

Jacques de Vaucanson (French: [ʒak də vocɑ̃sɔ̃]; February 24, 1709 – November 21, 1782) was a French inventor and artist who built the first all-metal lathe. This invention was crucial for the Industrial Revolution. The lathe is known as the mother of machine tools, as it was the first machine tool that led to the invention of other machine tools. He was responsible for the creation of impressive and innovative automata. He also was the first person to design an automatic loom.

== Early life ==
De Vaucanson was born in Grenoble, France in 1709 as Jacques Vaucanson (the nobiliary particle "de" was later added to his name by the Académie des Sciences.) The tenth child of a glove-maker, he grew up poor, and in his youth he reportedly aspired to become a clockmaker. He studied under the Jesuits and later joined the Order of the Minims in Lyon. It was his intention at the time to follow a course of religious studies, but he regained his interest in mechanical devices after meeting the surgeon Claude-Nicolas Le Cat, from whom he would learn the details of anatomy. This new knowledge allowed him to develop his first mechanical devices that mimicked biological vital functions such as circulation, respiration, and digestion.

== Automaton inventor ==
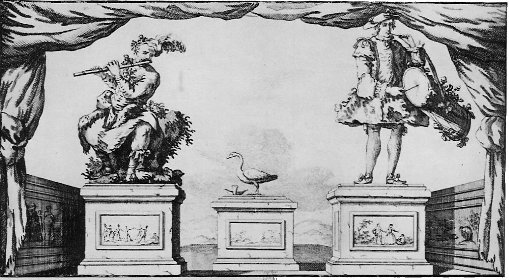
All three of Vaucanson's Automata: the Flute Player, the Digesting Duck, and the Tambourine Player.

At just 18 years of age, Vaucanson was given his own workshop in Lyon, and a grant from a nobleman to construct a set of machines. In that same year of 1727, there was a visit from one of the governing heads of Les Minimes. Vaucanson decided to make some lifelike machines. The automata would serve dinner and clear the tables for the visiting politicians. However, one government official declared that he thought Vaucanson's tendencies "profane", and ordered that his workshop be destroyed.

In 1737, Vaucanson built The Flute Player, a life-size figure of a shepherd that played the flute and had a repertoire of twelve songs. The figure's fingers were not pliable enough to play the flute correctly, so Vaucanson had to glove the creation in skin. The following year, in early 1738, he presented his creation to the Académie des Sciences.

Johann Joachim Quantz, court musician and long-time flute instructor to Frederick II of Prussia, discussed the shortcomings of Vaucanson's mechanical flute player. In particular its inability to sufficiently move the lips resulted in the necessity of increasing the wind pressure for the upper octaves. Quantz discouraged this method as producing a shrill, unpleasant tone.

At the time, mechanical creatures were somewhat a fad in Europe, but most could be classified as toys, and de Vaucanson's creations were recognized as being revolutionary in their mechanical lifelike sophistication.

Later that year, he created two additional automata, The Tambourine Player and The Digesting Duck, which is considered his masterpiece. The duck had over 400 moving parts in each wing alone, and could flap its wings, drink water, seemingly digest grain, and seemingly defecate. Although Vaucanson's duck supposedly demonstrated digestion accurately, his duck actually contained a hidden compartment of "digested food", so that what the duck defecated was not the same as what it ate; the duck would eat a mixture of water and seed and excrete a mixture of bread crumbs and green dye that appeared to the onlooker indistinguishable from real excrement. Although such frauds were sometimes controversial, they were common enough because such scientific demonstrations needed to entertain the wealthy and powerful to attract their patronage. Vaucanson is credited as having invented the world's first flexible rubber tube while in the process of building the duck's intestines. Despite the revolutionary nature of his automata, he is said to have tired quickly of his creations and sold them in 1743.

His inventions brought him to the attention of Frederick the Great, who sought to bring him to the Prussian court. Vaucanson refused, however, wishing to serve his own country.

== Government service ==
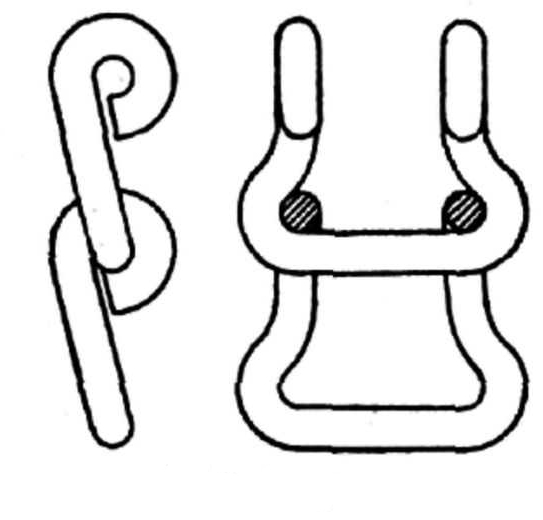
Vaucanson's chain

In 1741 de Vaucanson was appointed by Cardinal Fleury, chief minister of Louis XV, as inspector of the manufacture of silk in France. He was charged with undertaking reforms of the silk manufacturing process. At the time, the French weaving industry had fallen behind that of England and Scotland. During this time, Vaucanson promoted wide-ranging changes for automation of the weaving process. In 1745, he created the world's first completely automated loom, drawing on the work of Basile Bouchon and Jean-Baptiste Falcon. Vaucanson was trying to automate the French textile industry with punch cards – a technology that, as refined by Joseph-Marie Jacquard more than a half-century later, would revolutionize weaving and, in the twentieth century, would be used to input data into computers and store information in binary form. His proposals were not well received by weavers, however, who pelted him with stones in the street and many of his revolutionary ideas were largely ignored.

In 1746, he was made a member of the Académie des Sciences.

=== Lathe ===
In 1760 he invented the first industrial metal cutting slide rest lathe. Others place his invention in 1751. The lathe was described in the Encyclopédie and is exhibited at Musée des Arts et Métiers in France. It was designed to produce precision cylindrical rollers for crushing patterns into silk cloth. These were of copper rather than steel, so far easier to turn on a lathe, which may account for Vaucanson's omission from such works as Derry & Williams, who place this invention around 1768.

== Legacy ==
Jacques de Vaucanson died in Paris in 1782. Vaucanson left a collection of his work as a bequest to Louis XVI. The collection would become the foundation of the Conservatoire des Arts et Métiers in Paris. His original automata have all been lost. The flute player and the tambourine player were reportedly destroyed in the Revolution. Some had been sold to a glovemaker called Pierre Dumoulin (d. 1781), who exhibited them throughout Europe with great success. Dumoulin’s shows with Vaucanson’s automata in Saint Petersburg started the fashion of automata in Russia. In 1783, it was reported that the automata once exhibited by Dumoulin were still stored in Russia, but Dumoulin had manipulated them so that they would not work after his death.

Vaucanson’s proposals for the automation of the weaving process, although ignored during his lifetime, were later perfected and implemented by Joseph Marie Jacquard, the creator of the Jacquard loom.

Lycee Vaucanson in Grenoble is named in his honor, and trains students for careers in engineering and technical fields.

Vaucanson is a somewhat major character in Lawrence Norfolk's debut novel Lemprière's Dictionary. In this novel, Vaucanson is said to be a member of the secretive Cabbala and performs various primitive technological augmentations on living flesh (such as making the assassin Bahadur sent by the Nawab of the Carnatic into a husk or making the hounds of the Viscount Casterleigh into vicious bloodthirsty killers).

== See also ==
- Animatronics
- Mechanical Turk
- Robot
