= Jorge Rando =

Spanish painter and sculptor

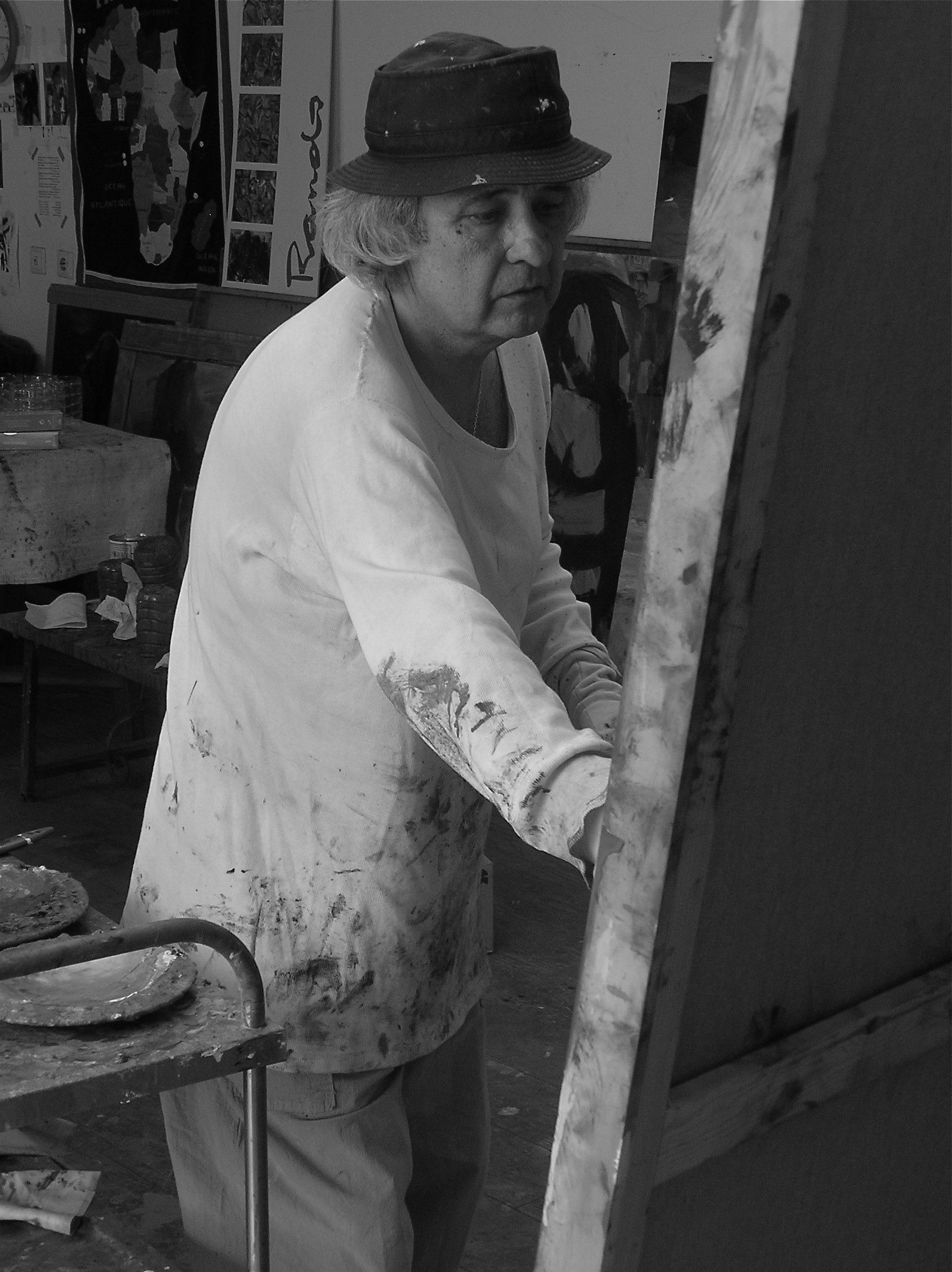
- Jorge Rando in his workshop
- Born: 23 June 1941 (age 85); Málaga, Barrio de la Victoria
- Known for: Painting, sculpting and drawing

Jorge Rando (born 23 June 1941, Málaga) is a Spanish painter and sculptor, considered one of the most recognised artist of the Neo-expressionist art movement. A world class study of key figures of Expressionism and Neo-expressionism, from the Museum of Modern Art in Salzburg, identified Rando as one of the best advocates of neo-expressionism in the world. The expert study selected Rando and Miguel Barceló as the only two representatives of this artistic movement in Spain. Therefore, in recognition of Rando's fruitful artistic career, the first Expressionist museum in Spain, inaugurated in Málaga in 2014, bears his name Museum Jorge Rando. Currently, the painter lives and works between Málaga, Spain and Hamburg, Germany.

In Germany, the artist's second home, his art work has also been recognised, since the prestigious Ernst Barlach Museum at Ratzeburg granted a permanent exhibition room to Rando oeuvres, making him the first living Spanish painter to receive such an honour.

== Biography ==
There is no message I can give.

— Jorge Rando about the aim of art.

Everything is moved by love; that is why creation without love is just colour without a soul.

— Jorge Rando about artistic Creation.

Jorge Rando was born in Málaga, Spain, in 1941. In the 1960s, he moved to Germany in order to pursue his philosophical studies, and where he met his wife Margit. He settled in Cologne, where he played a key role in the economic and cultural rebirth of the city after the Second World War. German culture and philosophy has been crucial for Rando's personal and artistic development. Since then, he has produced his art work in Spain and Germany, expanding the expressionist art movement in both cultures. Due to the mixture of cultures present in Rando's work, some consider it to be a cultural bridge that links the deep philosophical concepts of the German school with the powerful tradition of the Spanish artistic sensibility.The synergy between his philosophical concepts and his energetic painting converge in a language of great expressive force, that uses vigorous and colorful brushes.

According to his recently published Neo Expressionist Manifesto for the XXI century, entitled "Rando's Contemporary Art Testament," Rando is committed to bringing back the sense of spirituality in art, and promote expressionism, as an art movement capable of communicating the deepest inner human emotions that connect human kind. In a dehumanized world, Rando's paintings and sculptures are profoundly spiritual and humanistic.They offer the spectator a message of hope and humanity, where love is the force that moves the world.Rando uses neo-expressionism to merge human understanding and empathy in a world of indifference. This art form allows the artist to convey their feelings through their work, translating a message capable of reaching a wide range of people independent of their religion, sex, race, creed or belief.e.

== Style ==
Neo-expressionism is an art movement that uses strong chromatics, simplicity in figures and the absence of features to express feelings and its followers pursue the expressions of emotions through art, without paying regard to beauty or aesthetic. Although expressionist artists portray recognizable objects in an abstract manner, they do it in a rough and violently emotional way, often using vivid colours. An Expressionist artist's main objective is not to paint what they see, but what they feel. To many art critics and art historians, Rando is a good example of neo-expressionism, as his paintings are characterized by the exasperated distortion of shape, sensitivity in the use of colour, and the powerful presence of the artist's gestures and brushstrokes. To art historian Enrique Castaños, Art History professor at the University of Málaga, Spain: 'Rando is known for his powerful brushstroke and his expressive use of colors, which transmit powerful emotions to the spectator, representing a clear example of the neo-expressionist movement.'

The cycles: painting motives Rando's work is organized by common motives called "cycles," Throughout the years, the artist has portrayed common themes in his paintings and sculptures, returning to them as the years go by. Similar to some expressionist artist at the beginning of the 20th century, prostitutes and beggars are common characters in Rando's paintings, as well as Mother Nature and animals. However, some themes remain constant within the paintings; these include suffering or redemption through love.

The Cycles include paintings and sculptures on: Afrika, (figurative and abstract images on Africa's war and hunger exile); Passion ( a collection of religious paintings on the crucifixion of Christ); Maternaties (paintings and sculptures of mothers with their siblings); Prostitution (images of distorted female figures); Pintarradas-Sketchings (floral motives and animals); Käthe Kollwitz (a tribute to one of the great painters of Expressionism, which artwork and life is a testament to love and sacrifice), Children (figures of children walking or playing, where the artist seeks to capture unequivocal body movements of children); Cycling (abstract images of cyclers standing up or in motion); Landscapes and Vertical Horizons (a collection of paintings that combine a powerful use of colours, shapes and brush strokes that make the spectator to connect emotionally with nature and a spirituality); Portraits and Figures ( Portraits and other motives); Card Players (figurative images of people playing cards).

The common motives portrayed in Rando's paintings, evoke a strong humanistic vision, a profound sensibility for the suffering of others, spirituality as well as deep love for all living things. These works of art seek to raise the spectator's human and social consciousness and urge them to act. Several art critics and historians have written about Rando's cycles. For example, Jiménez wrote: Rando's artworks shook our consciousness with these socially concerned paintings; motivating the spectator to look to their inner self and to reflect in their own emotions.

On the cycles Carmen Pallarés wrote: " Afrika is an exhibition that shows the strength and the purity of Jorge Rando's Neo-Expressionism, and whose creation, it is inseparable to the artist´s philosophical and humanist principles." Adding(...) "from the unconcealed humanism of his stroke in Afrika, where the drawing manifest itself and the painter finds "the means for free expression, spontaneity and liberation from all ties; (...) to the extremely sensitive gaze to Prostitution, shaped by his energetic brushstrokes and its structured compositions. In Landscapes in Space and Vertical Horizons, the "observer of the painting," witnesses the "colours born from earth like roots.";... Through his philosophical conceptualism of his painting and his incessant investigation of the language of colour, the artist transport us from his own human facet to pure nature.

On the 23rd Volume of Málaga Art History Encyclopedia, art historian Enrique Castaños stated that Rando's (artwork) is clearly distinguible from his fellow contemporary artist by the use of thematically oriented series known as "cycles." Castaños wrote "throughout his pictorial series ( Prostitution, Afrika, The Passion, Käthe Kollwitz, Maternities, etc.), it is clear Rando's fundamental concern is to unravel the inside of the human soul through colour, the organic form, its distortion and the free traces of his brush stroke."

Ricardo Barnatán in Pintarradas wrote: "Rando's figurative landscapes, those quick and furious sketches, speaks of what takes place inside us not what we see outside. The brush strokes and the colours are representative of the interior of the painter and if the figures seem recognizable it´s because they work as words in a secret decoded message. A message written from the passion, in the sense of that glorious movement from the soul and the purified suffering as well."

== Prizes and Honours ==
Rando has received several prizes and awards throughout his career.

In 2018, in March the exhibition of ¨Qi Baishi - Jorge Rando: An Encounter¨, a cultural dialogue between East and West, gained a lot of attention. The same year, the exhibition ¨Naturalezas¨ took place.

In 2017, Rando was invited to participate in one of the most important events in Germany: "Reformations Jubiläums," a 500 years celebration of the Reform movement. The event is taking place in the German City of Emdem, declared European Capital of the Reform ( Reformationsstag Europass). The Exhibition was inaugurated on the 16th of July, under the title: "Ernst Barlach-Jorege Rando, Mystics of Modernity: Expressionism Yesterday and Today." After the celebration the tandem exhibition will travel to Berlin.

In 2016, he received the Ernst Barlach award, in recognition to his life's work and his commitment to expand new expressionism around the world. Jorge Rando is the first Spanish painter to receive this award, which is only given to select artist that have made worldwide contributions to art.

The same year the most popular art magazine in Europe, "ART Magazine," recommended Rando's exhibition "Passion Neuer Expressionismus," as one of the 15 best exhibitions in Europe not to miss that year.

In 2015, the City of Málaga awarded Jorge Rando with the prize to the Arts "Estrella Feniké". Additionally, it was awarded the prize "Museum of the Years 2015," by the association of writers Friends of Málaga (Amigos de Málaga).

In 2014, the Jorge Rando Museum was opened, where his artwork is collected and preserved. Moreover, it represents the headquarters of the homonymous foundation, which aims to study the Expressionism in the broadest sense of the phrase. The museum is located on the premises of the Monastery of "Las Madres Mercedarias" on the popular Molinillo neighbourhood, in Málaga downtown area.

In 2011, Rando was awarded the Perséfone Media Club Award to the Arts, as best Painter of the year. He designed the statue to be presented to the winners of the Spanish Cinema Festival (2011).

In 2010, Rando designed the sculpture for the winners of the SIGNIS Film Circuit.

In 2008, the Writers Association of Málaga gave him the "Best Artist " award.

In 2007, Rando was awarded the Plastic Arts Award in Madrid. The Álvaro Mutis Foundation gave him the prize for "the best art book of the year." The United Nations Education and Social Cooperation Organisation in Paris (UNESCO) awarded the book on Jorge Rando's artwork entitled "More Light," by Carmen Pallares the prize "Golden Book of the Plastic Arts." Libro de Oro de la Plástica. Unesco (Parish). The Spain's National Library (Madrid) purchased some drawings by the artist for its permanent collection.

In 2006. Rando received the prize from the Antiquaria Foundation for his contributions to Spanish Expressionism. That same year he was also awarded the Contemporary Art prize by "Te Tertulia Ilustrada" in Madrid.

== Select bibliography on Rando ==
Fifteen books have been published about Rando's artwork and artistic style, written by a multicultural group of art critics, art historians, writers, poets and journalists. All these authors seem to have a common denominator, Rando's artistic ability to express through his paintings and sculptures, the spirituality of human nature expressed through art. In 2007, the book on Rando's paintings written by art critic, Carmen Pallarés, entitled More Light, won the prestigious Unesco (Organización de las Naciones Unidas, para la Educación, la Ciencia y la Cultura) Art Book of the Year in Paris.

- The birth of colour. Published Foundation Jorge Rando. Málaga 2017. Text by Jorge Rando and Vanesa Diez.
- Encounter Jorge Rando - Carlos Ciriza. Published Foundation Jorge Rando. Málaga 2016. Text by Vanesa Diez and Carmen Pallarés.
- Encounter Ernst Barlach – Jorge Rando. Published Foundation Jorge Rando. Málaga 2015. Text by Heike Stockhaus and Vanesa Diez.
- Encounter Käthe Kollwitz – Jorge Rando. Published Foundation Jorge Rando. Málaga 2014. Text by Carmen Pallarés.
- Thoughts and Reflections. Jorge Rando. Published Foundation Jorge Rando. Málaga 2014. Text by Jorge Rando.
- The Ascetic Look in Painting. Published University of Málaga. Málaga 2010. Text by Enrique Castaños, Antonia María Castro, Carmen Pallarés, Rosa Martínez de Lahidalga, Julia Sáez-Angulo and Juan Maldonado.
- Hamburg Notebooks. Published Víctor i Fills Art Gallery S.L. Madrid 2010. Text by Carmen Pallarés.
- The Strength of Expression. Published City Council of Málaga. Málaga 2008. Text by Enrique Castaños, Carmen Pallarés and Julia Sáez-Angulo.
- The Passion in Rando's Paintings. Published Foundation Unicaja Málaga 2008. Text by Enrique Castaños, Carmen Pallarés, Juan Antonio Paredes and María Angeles Calahorra.
- The maternity theme in Jorge Rando's painting. Published Foundation Unicaja. Málaga 2007. Text by Enrique Castaños.
- Pintarradas. Trea Editions. Gijón 2007. Text by Marcos Ricardo Barnatán.
- More light!. Trea Editions. Gijón 2007. Text by Carmen Pallarés. Collaborations of Julia Sáez-Angulo and Evelyn Sion.
- Paisajes de pintura. Síntesis Editorial. Madrid 2006. Text by Carmen Pallarés and Rosa Martínez de Lahidalga.
- La teología de la Expresión. Published Foundation Cajasur. Cordova 2005. Text by Rafael Salas.
- Color con alma. Published GF Fauna's. Madrid 2004. Text by Carmen Pallarés.
- Las Golondrinas y el mar. Sagama Editions. Málaga 1999. Poemas by Rafael Salas. Illustrations by Jorge Rando.

== Recent exhibitions ==
- 2026, Jorge Rando. The Strength of Expression, National Art Museum of China, Beijing, China.
- 2025, Jorge Rando. Painting without love is just color without soul, Suzhou Jinji Lake Art Museum, China.
- 2025, Jorge Rando ... I Want to Paint Life, Jiushi Art Museum, Shanghai, China.
- 2024, Jorge Rando in Xuzhou. Different Cycles from Different Eras United by a Single Paintbrush, Xuzhou Art Museum, China.
- 2024, Jorge Rando in Shenzhen. Different Cycles from Different Eras United by a Single Paintbrush, Shenzhen Art Museum, China.
- 2023, Encounter in the Arena. Pablo Picasso and Jorge Rando, Málaga.
- 2022, Butterfly Cycle… Descendit ad Inferos, Málaga.
- 2022, The Young Years of an Old Master, Part II, Málaga.
- 2022, The Young Years of an Old Master, Part I, Málaga.
- 2022, Butterfly Tetralogy, Málaga.
- 2021, Soldiers, Málaga.
- 2020, Finsternis, Málaga.
- 2019, Butterflies, Málaga.
- 2019, Mediterranean Sun, Sichuan Museum of Art, China.
- 2018, Exhibition Encounter Qi Baishi-Jorge Rando, Málaga.
- 2018, Exhibition Naturalezas, Málaga.
- 2017, Exhibition "The Birth of Colour", Málaga, Exhibition "Ernst Barlach - Jorge Rando - Mystiker der Moderne", Emden. On Mat 22nd at the Museum Jorge Rando in Málaga, Spain; Rando's newest cycle was presented, under the name: The Birth of Colour... Can something that already exist be born?
- 2016, Exhibition "Passion Neuer Expressionismus", Hamburg, Exhibition "Encounter Ernst Barlach - Jorge Rando", Ratzeburg. Exhibition "Cycle, animals and other things", Málaga, Exhibition "Encounter Jorge Rando - Carlos Ciriza" Málaga.
- 2015, Exhibition on "Vertical Horizons" display together with an ample exhibition on "Landscapes in the Space", Málaga, Exhibition "The Light of Flower," Málaga. Atelier collaboration with twenty-five artists of the University of the Arts of Berlin (UdK) (Málaga)
- 2014, Grand Opening of the Museum Jorge Rando with 120 works of art from the cycles: Maternidad, Pintarradas, Prostitution and Afrika Málaga.
- 2013, San Ramón Nonato, Open-air Museum Málaga, Installation of the sculptural group of the Holy Week in Cervantes Theatre, Málaga.
- 2012, Víctor I Fills, Gallery Madrid, Polígono Gallery, Marbella, Exhibition on the Schloss Merode, Germany. Completed the "Jardín de la Conciencia" (Conscience Gardens) (Málaga).
- 2011, Víctor I Fills, Gallery Madrid, Intinerary Exhibition Iserlohn, Witten, Hamburg, Hannover, Cologne, Berlin.
- 2010, Foundation Gabarrón Museum "The Aestetic Gaze in Paintings," (New York), Principal's Hall at the University of Málaga, Málaga, Magnus P. Gerdsen, Gallery, Hamburg, Contemporary Art Fair, Madrid.
- 2009, Víctor I Fills Gallery, Madrid, Calviá Museum, Majorca, Opening of the Nazarian Gardens at the Málaga Cathedral, Málaga, Exhibition at the "Sala Noble", Málaga.
- 2008, Málaga Museo del Patrimonio Municipal, Málaga, Episcopal Palace, Málaga, Drawings for the Málaga's Cathedral Glass Work, Málaga.
- 2007, Antiquaria Foundation, Madrid, Contemporary Art Fair, Madrid, Fauna Gallery, Madrid, Unicaja Foundation, Málaga.
- 2006, Contemporary Art Fair (Miami), Contemporary Art Fair Madrid, Annta Gallery, Madrid, Exhibition Rando's Art Buenos Aires.
- 2005, Art Fair (New York), Fauna Gallery Madrid, Contemporary Art Saloon Strasbourg, Cajasur Foundation, Cordova.
- 2004, Ignacio de Lassaleta Gallery, Barcelona, Carlos de Amberes Foundation, Madrid, Contemporary Art Festival (Paris), Contemporary Art Fair, Cologne, Exhibition Lisbon. 90,000 drawings on the Holy week from the artist were downloaded from the web in two days.

== Sources ==
- Pallarés, Carmen (2010). Hamburg Notebooks. Spain: Victor i Fills Art Gallery. ISBN 978-84-613-7714-5.
- Pallarés, Carmen (2006). More Light!. Spain: Ediciones Trea. ISBN 978-84-9704-287-1.
