= Karl Adam (rowing coach) =

German rowing coach

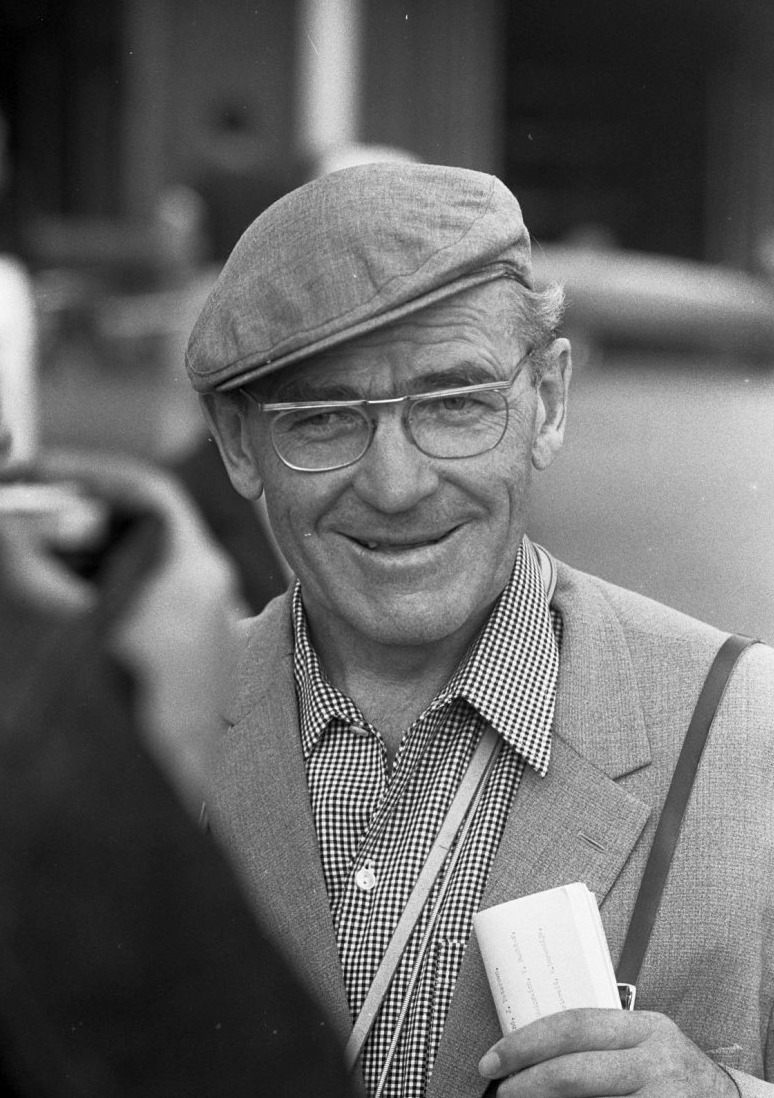
- Karl Adam in 1968
- Born: 2 May 1912; Hagen, Germany
- Died: 18 June 1976 (aged 64); Bad Salzuflen, Germany
- Known for: Theoretical studies about rowing technique

Karl Adam (2 May 1912 in Hagen – 18 June 1976 in Bad Salzuflen) was one of the most successful and innovative German rowing coaches. Although he was never an active rower himself, he helped win 29 medals at major rowing events, including three Olympic gold medals, two world and five European Championships.

== Early life ==
Adam was born on 2 May 1912 in Vorhalle; at the time an independent district but since 1929, it belongs to the city of Hagen. He received his secondary education at the Oberrealschule in Hagen. In 1931, he started studying towards a teaching degree in the subjects mathematics, physics, and physical education. After obtaining his degree, he joined the Reichsakademie für Leibesübungen in Berlin in 1937. That year, he became student world champion in heavyweight boxing in Paris. World War II finished his sporting career and Adam received serious injuries in Normandy, France. After a time in hospital, he became a prisoner of war with the French forces. In 1948, he had his first job as a teacher at the Lauenburgische Gelehrtenschule in Ratzeburg, Schleswig-Holstein. It was at the Lauenburgische Gelehrtenschule that he was put in charge of school rowing.

== Coaching career ==
Adam was co-founder of the Ratzeburg Rowing Club in 1953 and head of the Rowing Academy there. He never rowed and learned the rowing and sculling techniques by reading and observation in the late 1930s. He was a competitive boxer and a Student World Champion in 1937. He accompanied the German rowing team to the 1956 Summer Olympics as sculling coach. Germany performed poorly, and Adam returned determined to revolutionise their program to improve performance.

A great innovator of rowing and training techniques, Adam's methods had a major impact on the further development of rowing. His rowing technique became known in the rowing world as the "Ratzeburg" style. Adam was the first to adapt fartlek, also known as speedplay, and interval training from track (athletics) as well as heavy weight training to rowing. He pioneered a new, more efficient, oar design and was the first coach to use "bucket" or "German" rigging. He wrote that he did NOT object that his rowers were using anabolic steroids. But it ought to be the decision of the rower himself. Officials, the coaching and medical staff should inform of the advantages and dangers, but never tell the athlete which decision to take.

== Death ==
Adam died suddenly and unexpectedly on 18 June 1976 in Bad Salzuflen.
