= Karl Friedrich Wilhelm Rußwurm =

German historian

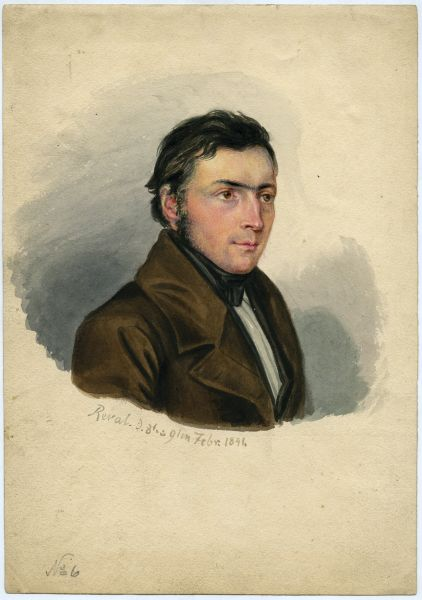
- Born: November 25, 1812; Ratzeburg, French Empire (now Germany)
- Died: February 17, 1883 (aged 70); Tallinn, Russian Empire (now Estonia)

Karl Friedrich Wilhelm Rußwurm (also known as Carl Friedrich Wilhelm or just von Rußwurm; 25 November 1812 in Ratzeburg, Germany (Note: At that time, a part of Napoleon's French Empire.) – 17 February 1883 in Reval (Tallinn), Estonia) was a German-Estonian pedagogue, ethnologist and historian.

== Life and work ==
Rußwurm came from a family of theologians and educators. His father, Johann Georg Rußwurm (1781–1848) was the rector of the cathedral school at Ratzeburger Dom and later a pastor in Selmsdorf, and his uncle Johann Wilhelm Bartholomäus Rußwurm was also a pastor. His younger brother, Johannes Rußwurm (1814–1890), later became the provost of Ratzeburg.

After attending the cathedral school his father taught, he studied theology in Bonn and Berlin. In 1831, he became a member of the Burschenschaft Populonia Bonn and in 1832 a member of the Kränzchenverein Berlin. In 1835, he went to Estonia as a private tutor. In 1839, he was appointed inspector of the Knights and Domschule at Reval (now Tallinn). In 1841, he moved to the health resort town of Hapsal (now Haapsalu), where he initially worked as a teacher and later as an inspector of the local county school. After his retirement in 1868, he worked on scientific works and returned to Reval, where he was appointed an archivist of the Estonian chancery. He dealt mainly with Estonian cultural history and ethnography and the genealogy of Baltic German families. In Hapsal, his most important work was Eibofolke or The Swedes On the Coast of Esthland and Runö (Runö now being modern Ruhnu), where he received the prestigious Demidov Prize.

== Works ==
- Nordische Sagen. Der deutschen Jugend erzählt und mit einem wissenschaftlichen Anhange versehen. Leipzig: Fleischer 1842
- Eibofolke oder die Schweden an der Küste Esthlands und auf Runö, eine ethnographische Untersuchung mit Urkunden, Topographie und Geschichte, Erser Theil, Reval 1855
- Eibofolke oder die Schweden an der Küste Esthlands und auf Runö, eine ethnographische Untersuchung mit Urkunden, Tabellen und lithographirten Beilagen, Zweiter Theil, Reval 1855 E-Text
- Geschichte Alt-Pernau's. Reval 1880
- Nachrichten über das Geschlecht Ungern-Sternberg. Reval 1872–1875
- Nachrichten über das adeliche und freiherrliche Geschlecht Stael von Holstein esthländischer Linie.
- Genealogia Lutherorum rediviva oder die Familie Luther in Esthland und Rußland. (posthum) Reval 1883.
