= Ratzeburg Rowing Club =

Rowing Club from Ratzeburg, Germany

- Location: Ratzeburg, Germany
- Founded: 1953

Distinctions
- Gold - 1960 Summer Olympics, Silver - 1964 Summer Olympics, Gold - 1968 Summer Olympics

Notable members
- Thomas Lange

The Ratzeburg Rowing Club was founded in 1953 and is located in the town of Ratzeburg, Germany. Karl Adam was one of its founders and was head of the Rowing Academy there.

Between 1959 and 1968, the Ratzeburg Club won seven titles at World and European Championships. In addition the eight won a gold medal at the 1960 Summer Olympics in Rome, a silver medal at the 1964 Summer Olympics in Tokyo, and a gold medal at the 1968 Summer Olympics in Mexico.

Thomas Lange was a member of the club when he won his third Olympic medal in 1996 in the single scull. He had also won medals representing East Germany prior to the German reunification. He continues to row for the club.

== Honours ==
=== Henley Royal Regatta ===
Year	Races won
1965	Grand Challenge Cup
