= Museum Jorge Rando =

Coordinates: 36.7268°N 4.4238°W

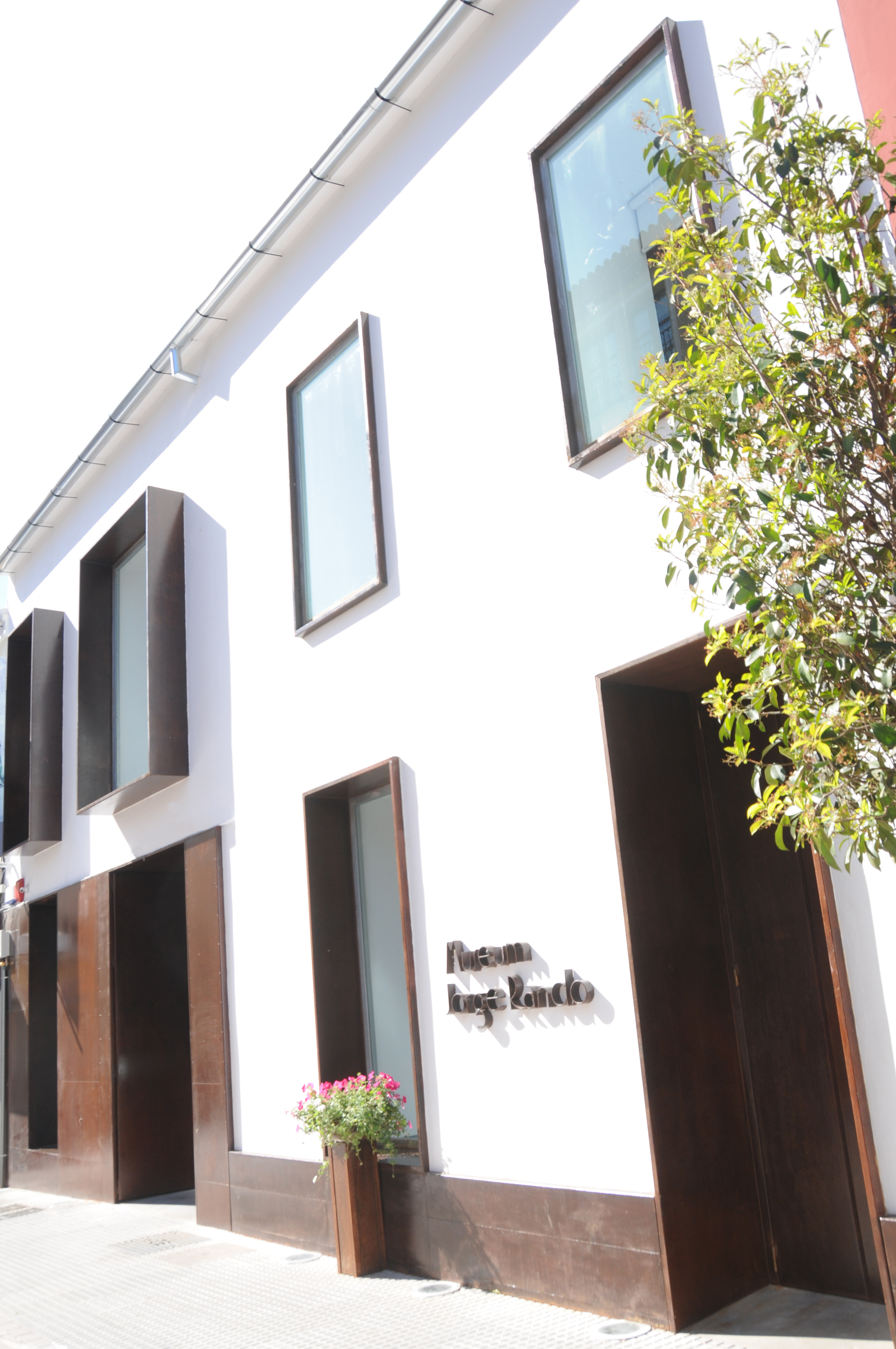
- Interactive map of Museum Jorge Rando

General information
- Architectural style: Contemporary
- Location: Málaga, Spain

Technical details
- Structural system: Structure-based portal of reinforced concrete

Design and construction
- Architect: D. José Antonio González Vargas

Website
- museojorgerando.org/en/index.html

The Museum Jorge Rando is the first expressionist museum in Málaga, Andalusia, Spain. Dedicated to the painter Jorge Rando, it collects his works and it temporally hosts the works of other national and international artists belonging to this movement. It was officially inaugurated on May 28, 2015.

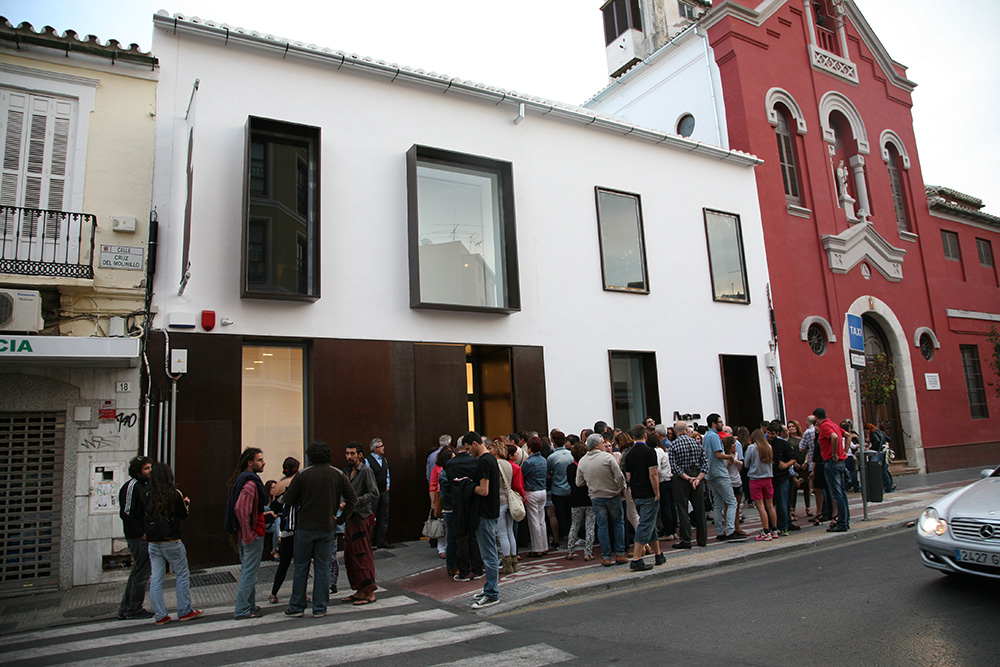
Façade of the Museum Jorge Rando

== The Museum ==
The mission of the museum is centered first of all on the study and the diffusion of the Jorge Rando work, as well as on the investigation about poetics of Expressionism, a movement which started at the end of the 19th century and is still pretty active in our times, and thanks to it some of the most fecund contributions to the contemporary western culture, in the wider sense, originated. The study and the representation of the different artistic facets, such as painting, sculpture, architecture, philosophy, literature, cinema, and music, are included among its priorities.

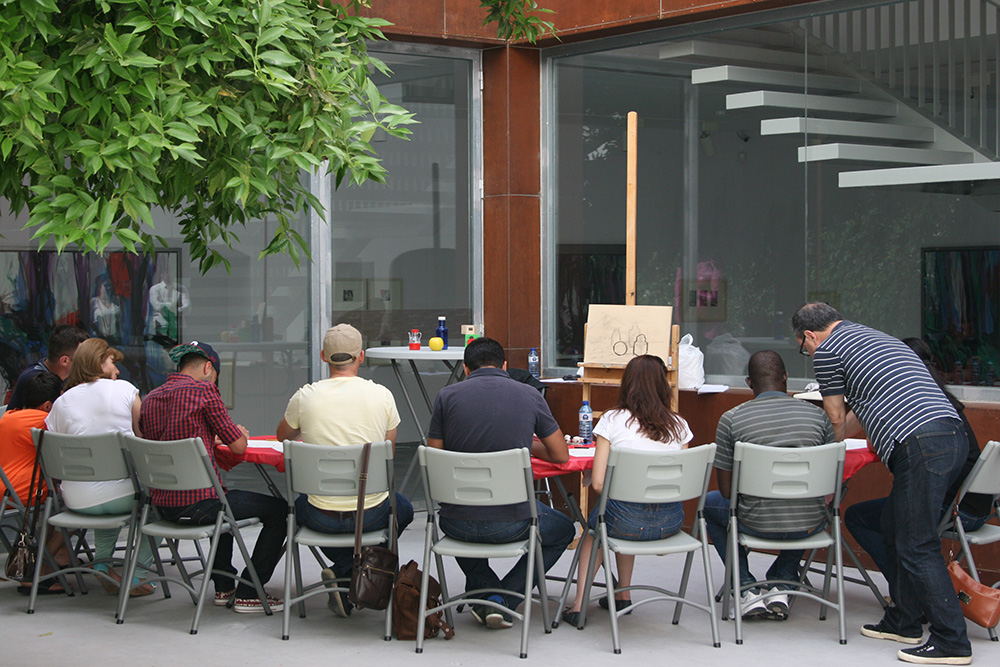
Social inclusion through Art with CEAR.

It is a museum which is meant to be the reflection of Jorge Rando's work, originating a cultural philosophy homologated to his thinking. Moved by the motto "Doors are always open… so that people can go inside and the museum goes outside", it has become a museum which looks at the Arts under a spiritual and humanistic perspective.

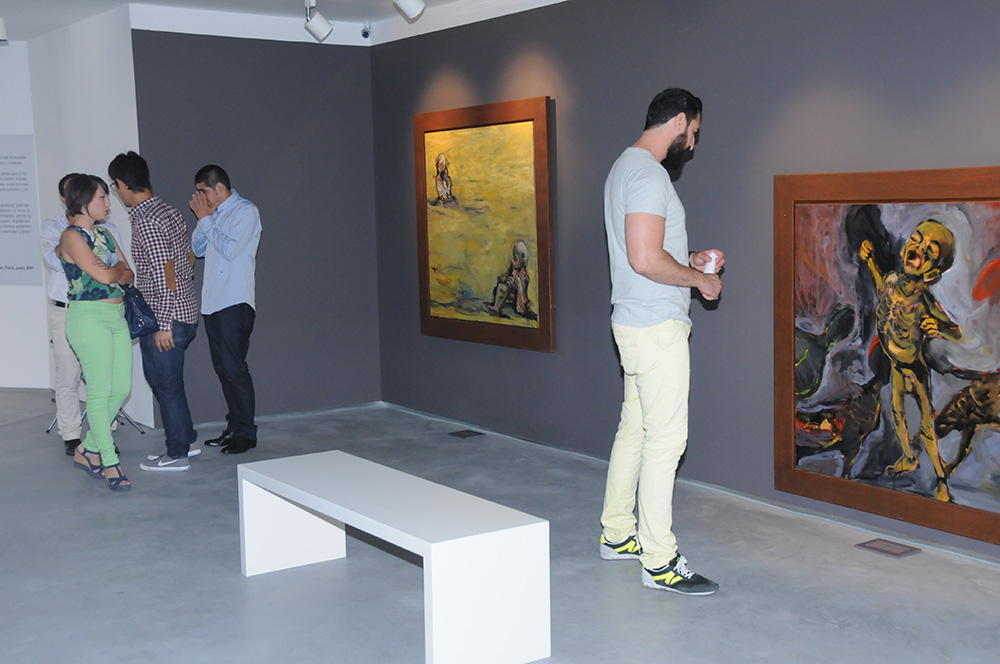
Museum Jorge Rando: Room 4.

Entrance and guided tours assistance are all free.

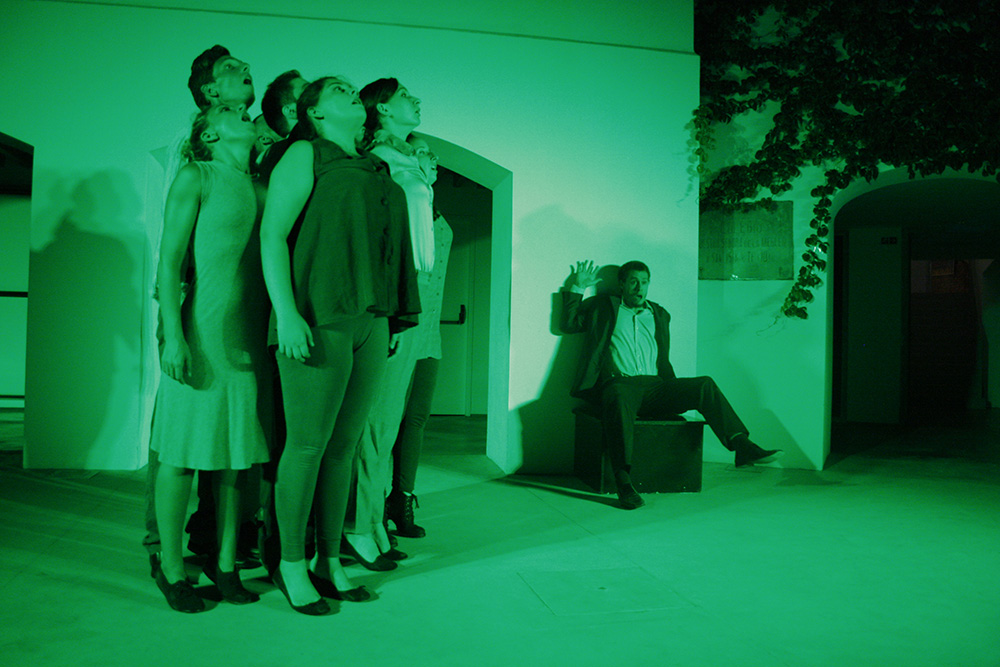
Picture from the performance 'Personne', event of 'El Gabinet' (ciclo de literatura).

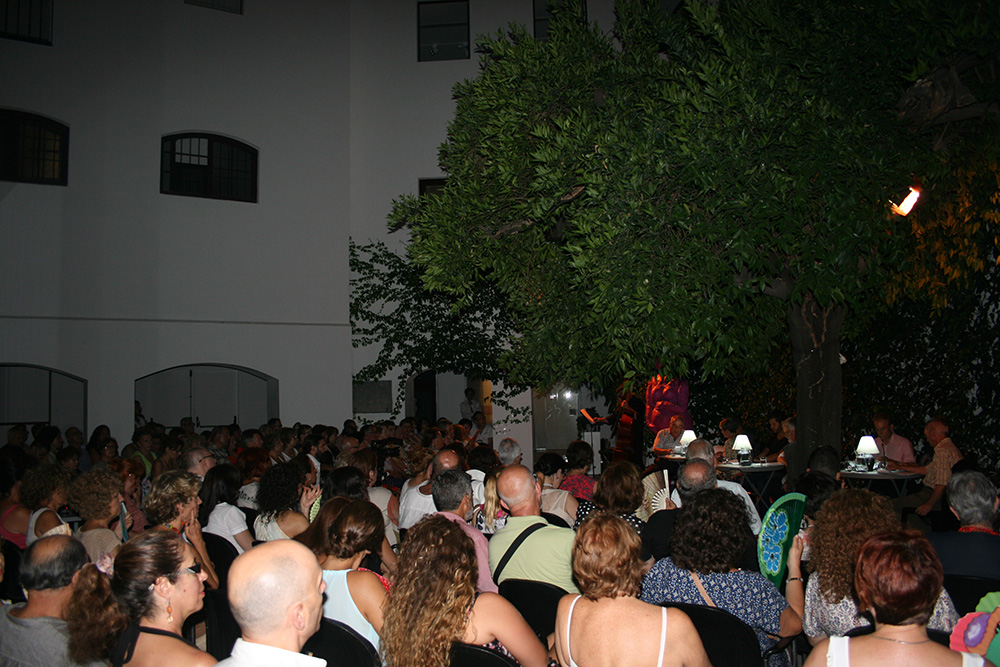
'Versos y canciones para las noches de estío', poem cycle

== Exhibitions ==
=== Jorge Rando Work ===
The rooms host Jorge Rando's artistic production, with an expositive discourse on the move, characterized by the interchange of the artist’s different themed cycles, in order to accompany the artwork of the invited artists.

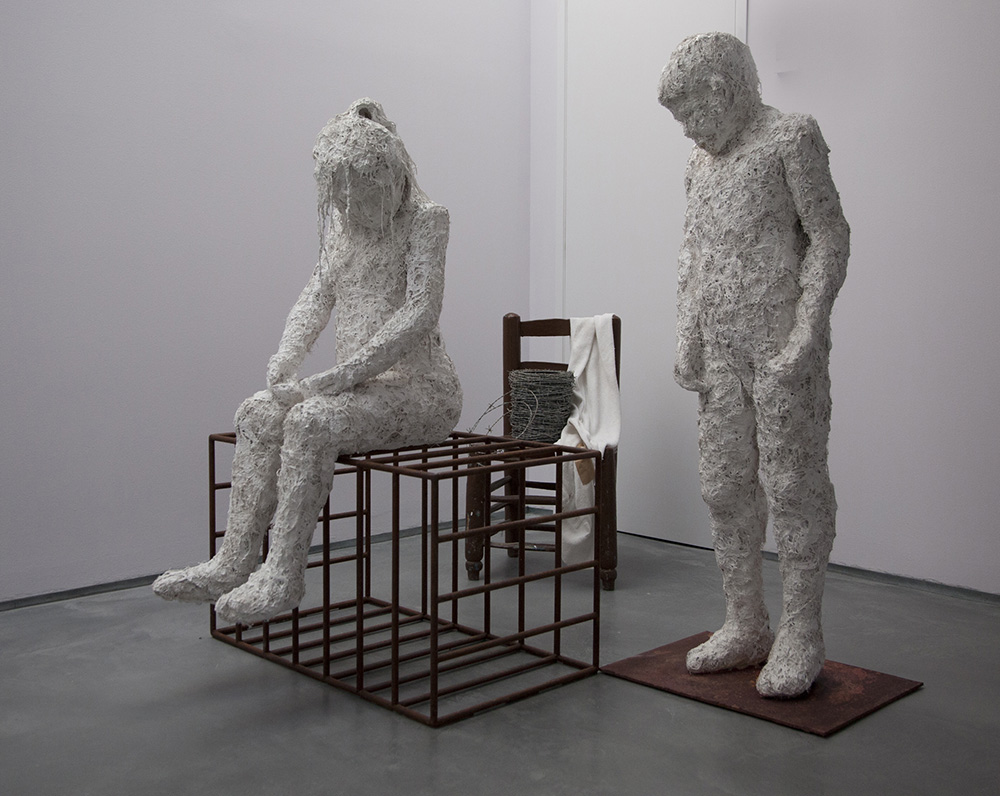
Sculpture of 'Children' belonging to the cycle 'Prostitución'.

=== Temporary exhibitions ===
The temporary exhibitions embrace national and international artists bound to expressionism or neo-expressionism. During its first year it held an exhibition of the drawings of the artist Käthe Kollwitz and on the 14th of the following December there will be inaugurated the first magna exhibition in Spain of the sculptor Ernst Barlach.

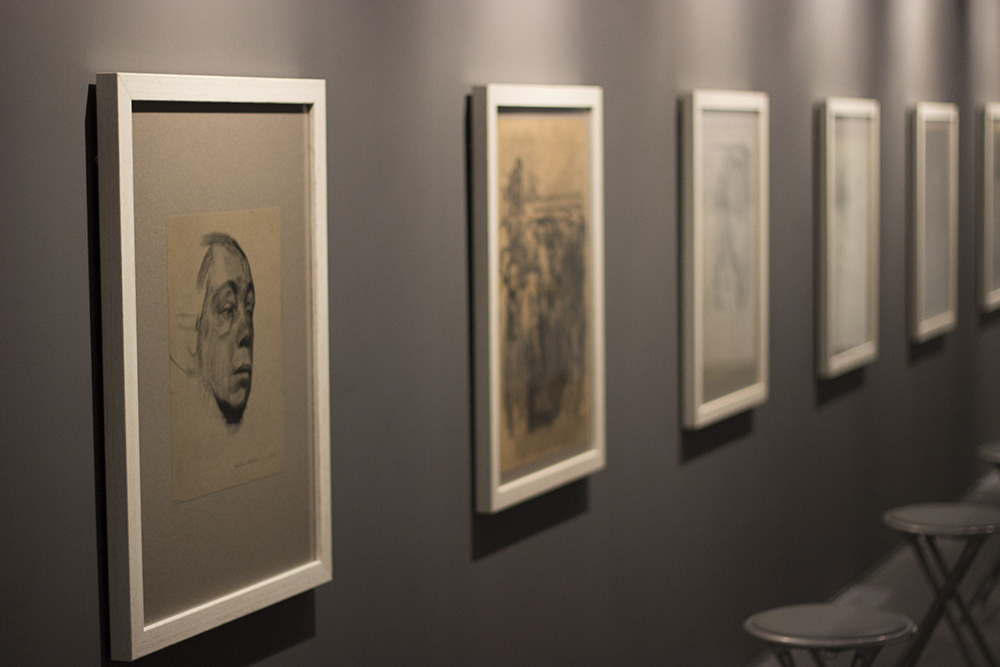
Temporary exhibition about the work of Käthe Kollwitz.

== La Sala de Estar del Arte ==
The museum is meant to be the Living Room of Art (La Sala de Estar del Arte). All throughoutthe year it embraces representations of different artistic disciplines. El color del sonido (The color of the sound) is the cycle dedicated to music; Luces y sombras (Lights and Shadows) is the film screening and discussion cycle, with introduction and a debate at the end; El Gabinet is the cycle dedicated to literature, theatre, and narrative; Arte (Art) is the cycle dedicated to art discussions and Reports, and artistic meetings, while Lo que está pasando (What is going on) is the cycle dedicated to the debate about different themes and issues, coordinated by the UNESCO chair of Communication of Málaga University.

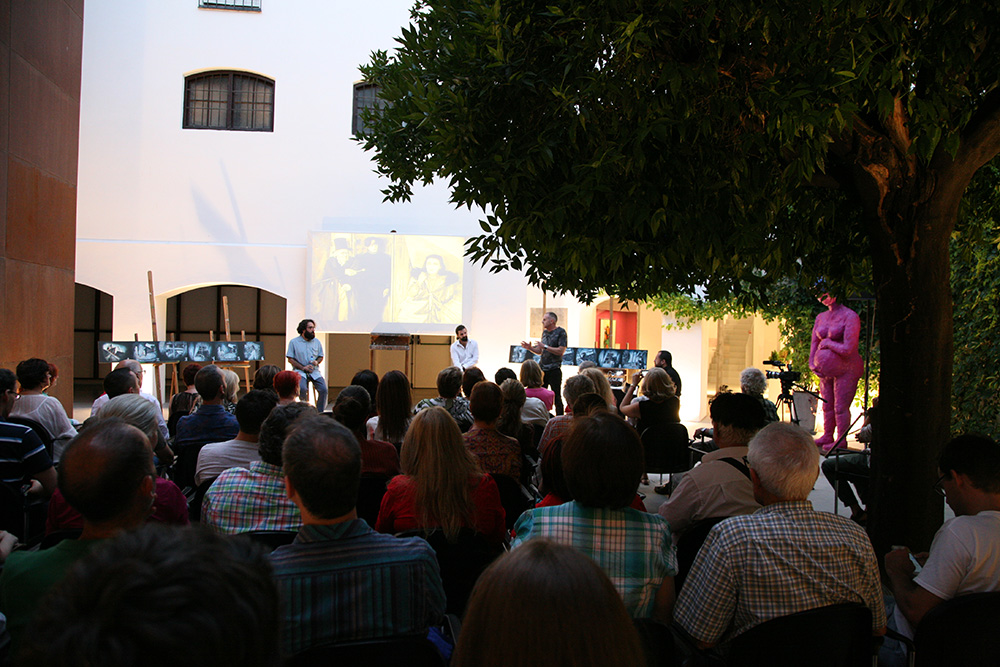
Picture from the cinema cycle called 'Luces y sombras'.

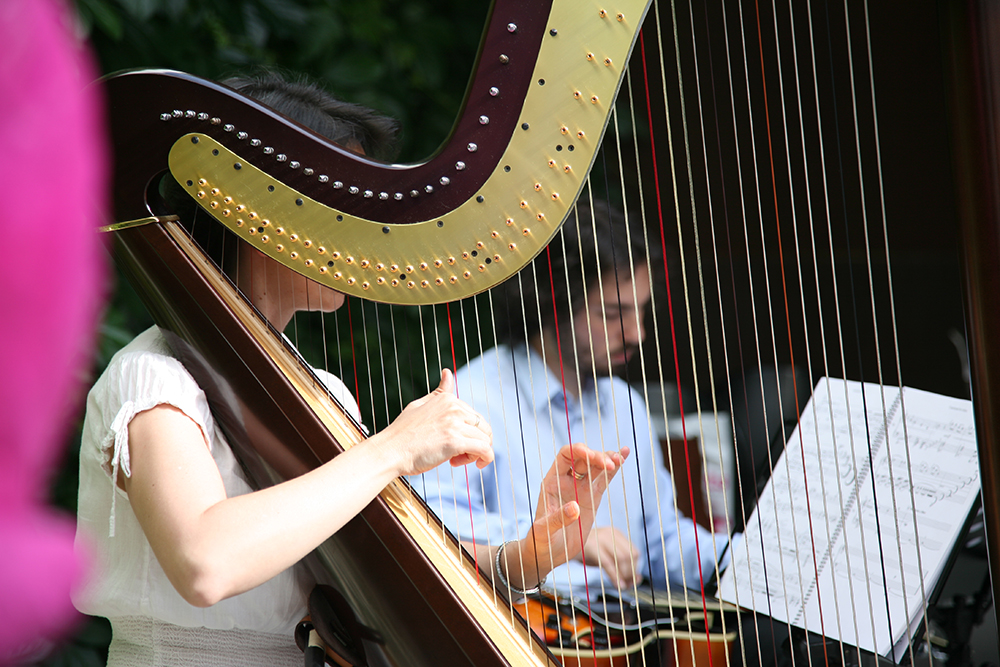
Event from the music cycle 'El color del sonido'.

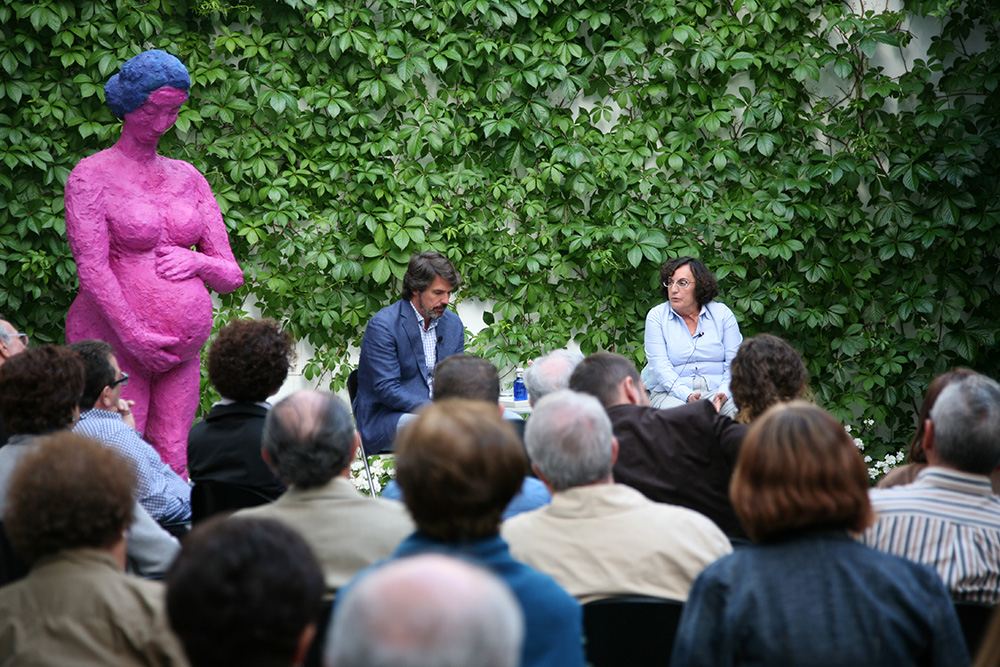
'Lo que está pasando', the cycle dedicated to the debate about topical issues.

== Visits and education ==
The museum offers Guided tours, that need neither to be booked nor a minimum number of participants. They are discussions offered by Art Historians, in which prefixed guidelines do not exist: they are meant to be an exchange of impressions related to the visitant requests and the necessities, so that every visit turns into a discovery and a mutual enrichment.

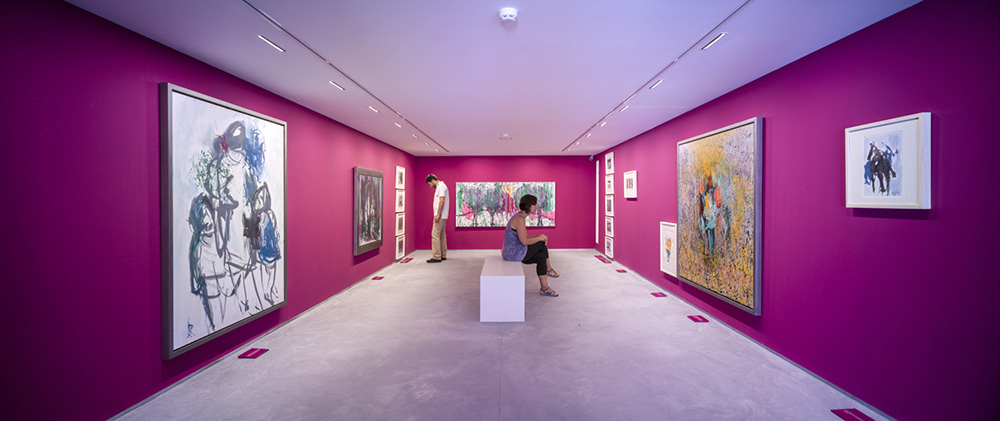
Museum Jorge Rando: Room 3.

Also personalized tours can be arranged, for groups that have special necessities. There is a program aimed to let expressionism, neo-expressionism, and the contemporary art in general become closer to students, thanks to guided tours, artistic workshops, and debate meetings.

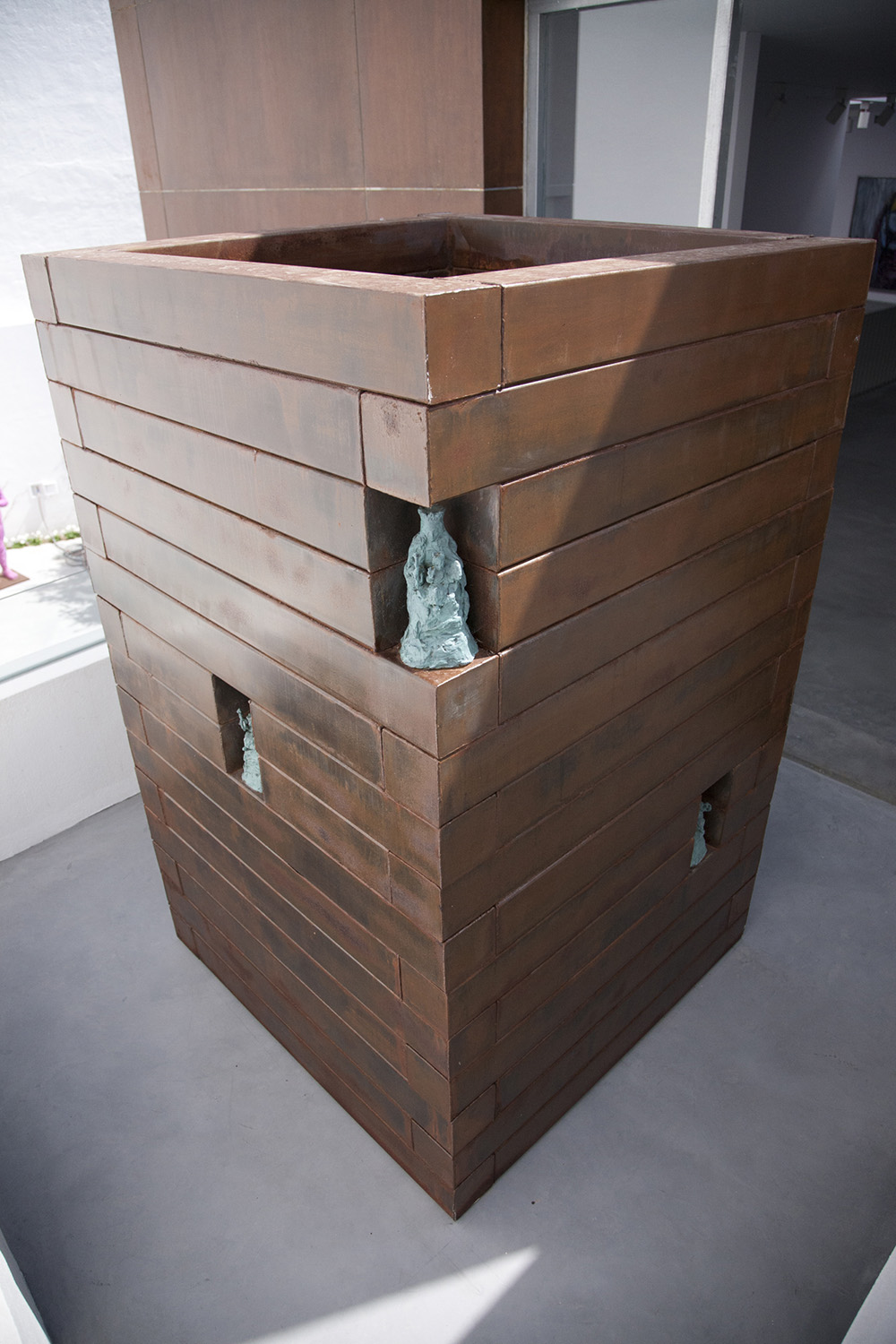
Sculputure with six chapels in honour of the Lady of Victory.

== The Building ==
The Museum Jorge Rando is an integral part of the Las Mercedarias monastery, in via Cruz del Molinillo, Málaga. It was built on the drawings of the architect D. Manuel Rivera Valentín (1878) and it is considered an emblematic building, mainly of artistic interest. A magnificent specimen of mandarin orange tree stands out in the posterior inner yard of the monastery: more than 140 years ago it was planted by the founder of the monastery.

The adjustment works made to a part of the monastery, in order to turn it into the museum, were started in 2011 by the City Council of Málaga and they finished during the Spring 2014, under the direction of the architect D. José Antonio González Vargas. The strength of expressionist art could not have found a better place than one that preserves such a spiritual implication.

== Installations ==
The Museum Jorge Rando has combined in its construction the old side of the courtyard with the new installation in béton brut (raw concrete) and Weathering steel. A synergy that combines the spirituality and quietness of the monastery with the strength of the Expressionist art.

It has four exposition rooms illuminated by natural light: this is one of the most relevant points of the construction. Moreover, in the museum there are other spaces like the library, the inner yard and the workshop, which is the space dedicated to the creation of Paintings. A group of artists usually make regular use of it, making it a meeting point where the dialogue between artists, Historians, and visitors is always open, allowing the continuous exchange of opinions and the debate about Art and culture.

== Administration ==
The direction, administration and all the activities of the museum, such as the exhibition, the cycles of debate related to art and the aesthetics of expressionism, the workshops, and seminars, etc., will be under the direction of the Jorge Rando Foundation.
