= Johannes Falke =

German historian (1823–1876)

Johannes, or Johann Friedrich Gottlieb Falke (20 April 1823 – 2 March 1876) was a German historian.

He was born at Ratzeburg, Duchy of Holstein. Entering the University of Erlangen-Nuremberg in 1843, he soon began to devote his attention to the history of the German language and literature, and in 1848 went to Munich, where he remained five years, and diligently availed himself of the use of the government library for the purpose of prosecuting his historical studies. In 1856 he was appointed secretary of the German museum at Nuremberg, and in 1859, keeper of the manuscripts.

With the aid of the manuscript collections in the museum he now turned his attention chiefly to political history, and, with Johann H. Müller, established a historical journal under the name of "Zeitschrift für deutsche Kulturgeschichte" (4 volumes, Nuremberg, 1856-1859). To this journal he contributed a history of German taxation and commerce. On the latter subject he published separately Geschichte des deutschen Handels (2 volumes, Leipzig, 1859-1860) and Die Hansa als deutsche See- und Handelsmacht (Berlin, 1862).

In 1862 he was appointed secretary of the state archives at Dresden, and, a little later, keeper. There he began the study of Saxon history, still devoting his attention chiefly to the history of commerce and economy, and published Die Geschichte des Kurfürsten August von Sachsen in volkswirthschaftlicher Beziehung (Leipzig, 1868) and Geschichte des deutschen Zollwesens (Leipzig, 1869). He died at Dresden.
