= Ratzeburg =

- Town
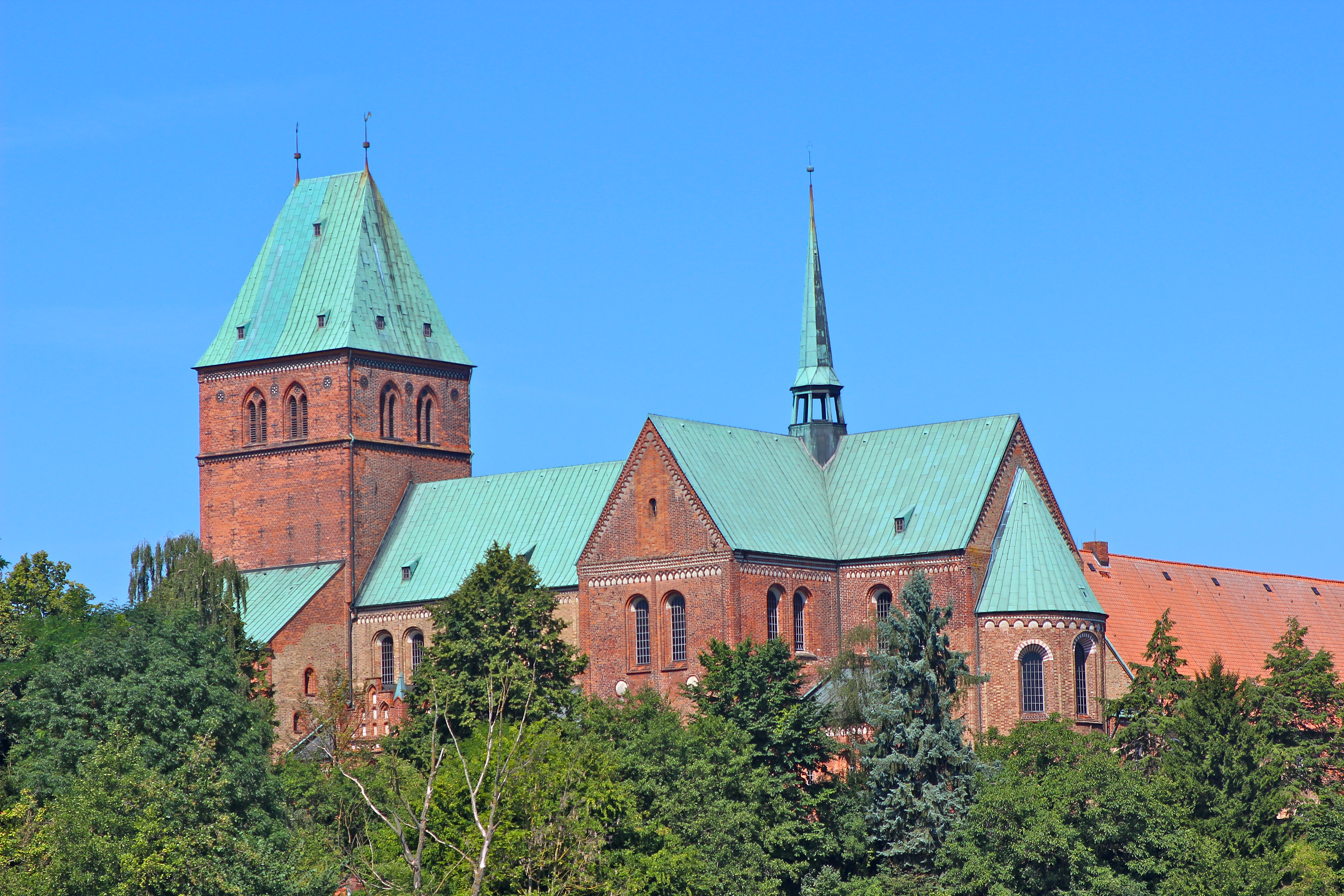
- Ratzeburg Cathedral

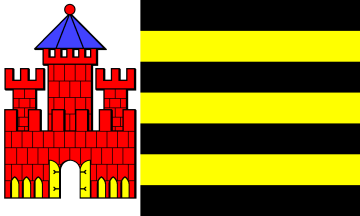
- Flag Coat of arms

- Location of Ratzeburg within Herzogtum Lauenburg district
- Interactive map of Ratzeburg
- Location within Germany Location within Schleswig-Holstein
- Coordinates: 53°42′N 10°45′E
- Country: Germany
- State: Schleswig-Holstein
- District: Herzogtum Lauenburg

Government
  - Mayor: Eckhard Graf

Area
  - Total: 30.29 km^{2} (11.70 sq mi)
- Elevation: 36 m (118 ft)

Population (2025-12-31)
  - Total: 14,952
  - Density: 493.6/km^{2} (1,278/sq mi)
- Time zone: UTC+01:00 (CET)
  - Summer (DST): UTC+02:00 (CEST)
- Postal codes: 23909
- Dialling codes: 04541
- Vehicle registration: RZ
- Website: www.ratzeburg.de

Ratzeburg (German pronunciation: [ˈʁatsəbʊʁk]; Low German: Ratzborg) is a town in Schleswig-Holstein, Germany. It is surrounded by four lakes—the resulting isthmuses between the lakes form the access lanes to the town. Ratzeburg is the capital of the district of Herzogtum Lauenburg.

== History ==
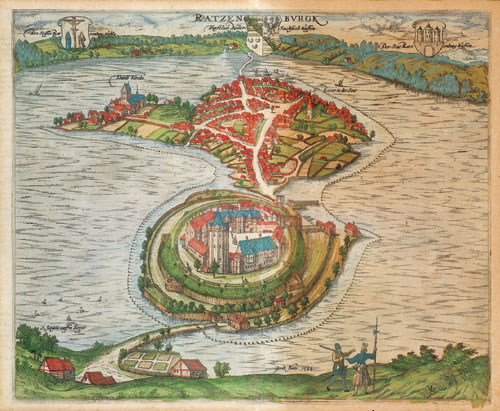
Ratzeburg, ca. 1590

The town was founded in the 11th century as Racisburg. The name is traditionally derived from the local Wendish ruler, Prince Ratibor of the Polabians, who was nicknamed Ratse. In the year 1044 Christian missionaries under the leadership of the monk Ansverus came into the region and built a monastery. It was destroyed in a pagan rebellion in 1066; the monks were stoned to death. Today monuments to the missionaries in two of the town's churches commemorate these events. Ansverus was canonised in the 12th century and his relics were entombed in the Ratzeburg cathedral.

Henry the Lion became the ruler of the town in 1143 and established a bishopric in 1154. He was also responsible for the construction of the late Romanesque Cathedral (Dom), built in typical north German 'red-brick' style. Henry also prompted the construction of the similar-looking Lübeck Cathedral and Brunswick Collegiate Church with his remains interred in the latter.

Since 1180 part of Ratzeburg diocesan area formed a Prince Bishopric, whose ruler was sovereign and as such had a vote at the Imperial Diet. The Prince-Bishopric of Ratzeburg was the last state in Northern Germany remaining Catholic. After the 1550 death of its ruler Prince-Bishop Georg von Blumenthal, who feuded with Thomas Aderpul, the bishopric converted to Lutheranism in 1554.

Though the town of Ratzeburg was part of the Ratzeburg diocese, the town itself was not within the territory of the Prince-Bishopric of Ratzeburg, but formed a part of the old Duchy of Saxony and became part of its dynastic partition of Saxe-Lauenburg around 1296, remaining with this duchy under altering dynasties until 1876. The cathedral quarter again formed an immunity district (Domfreiheit; cf. also Liberty) to the prince-bishopric, secularised as a principality in 1648. In 1619 Saxe-Lauenburg's capital was moved from Lauenburg upon Elbe to Ratzeburg and remained there since. The town was almost completely destroyed in 1693, when Christian V of Denmark reduced Ratzeburg to rubble by bombardment in his unsuccessful attempt to push through his succession to the dukedom against the prevailing House of Hanover. After this event Ratzeburg was rebuilt in baroque style. The castle, however, was never reconstructed or built anew.

Ratzeburg briefly was part of the First French Empire during the Napoleonic Wars, afterwards the Duchy of (Saxe-)Lauenburg was awarded in personal union to the Danish crown in the Congress of Vienna. After the Danish crown lost Lauenburg in the Second Schleswig War (1864), Lauenburg's estates of the realm offered the dukedom to the Prussian Hohenzollern dynasty in personal union, who accepted in 1865. On 1 July 1876 the Duchy of Lauenburg merged into the Kingdom of Prussia's Province of Schleswig-Holstein, forming the still existing district Herzogtum Lauenburg (Duchy of Lauenburg) seated in Ratzeburg. The former cathedral immunity district, at last a part of Mecklenburg, finally became part of the town of Ratzeburg with the 1937 Greater Hamburg Act.

From 1945 to 1989 the Iron Curtain ran just east of the town, putting it on the border with the German Democratic Republic.

== Sport ==
Ratzeburg is known for its Olympic champion Ratzeburg Rowing Club, which was responsible for training, among others, the gold medalists at the 1956 Olympic Games in Melbourne. The grave of Ernst Barlach, perhaps the most notable creative artist to have made his home in Ratzeburg, is located in one of the town's cemeteries.

== Twin towns – sister cities ==
Ratzeburg is twinned with:

- Châtillon-sur-Seine, France
- Ribe, Denmark
- Esneux, Belgium
- Schönberg, Germany
- Sopot, Poland
- Strängnäs, Sweden
- Walcourt, Belgium

== Notable people ==
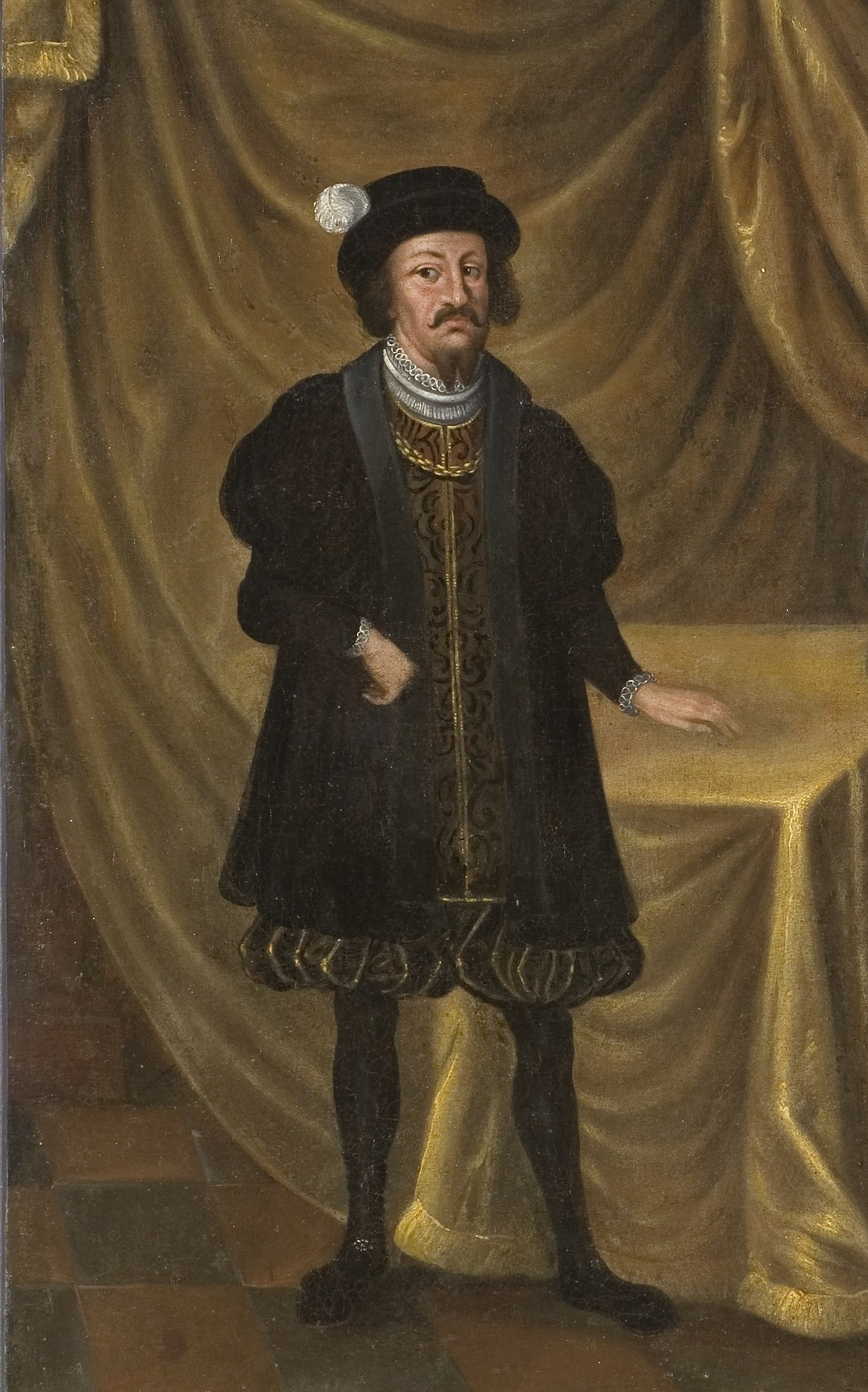
Magnus I, Duke of Saxe-Lauenburg, 1520

- Magnus I, Duke of Saxe-Lauenburg (1470–1543), nobleman, buried here
- Catherine of Saxe-Lauenburg (1513–1535), the first wife of Gustav I of Sweden and thus Queen of Sweden
- Augustus, Duke of Saxe-Lauenburg (1577–1656), Duke of Saxe-Lauenburg between 1619 and 1656.
- Sibylle of Saxe-Lauenburg (1675–1733), regent of Baden-Baden
- Karl Friedrich Wilhelm Rußwurm (1812–1893), German-Estonian pedagogue, ethnologist and historian
- Johannes Falke (1823–1876), a German historian.
- Otto Heinrich Enoch Becker (1828–1890), a German ophthalmologist
- Ernst Catenhusen (1841–1918), a German conductor and composer, also active in the United States.
- Ernst Barlach (1870–1938), sculptor
- Friedrich Weidemann (1871–1919), a German baritone, lead singer at the Vienna State Opera
- Jürgen Hinzpeter (1937–2016), German journalist best known for his coverage of the Gwangju Uprising.
- Günter Harder (born 1938), German mathematician, specializing in arithmetic geometry and number theory.

=== Sport ===
- Karl Adam (1912–1976), rowing coach
- Klaus Behrens (1941–2022), a German rower, silver medallist at the 1964 Summer Olympics
- Florian Mennigen (born 1982), German rower, gold medallist. at the 2012 Summer Olympics

== Gallery ==
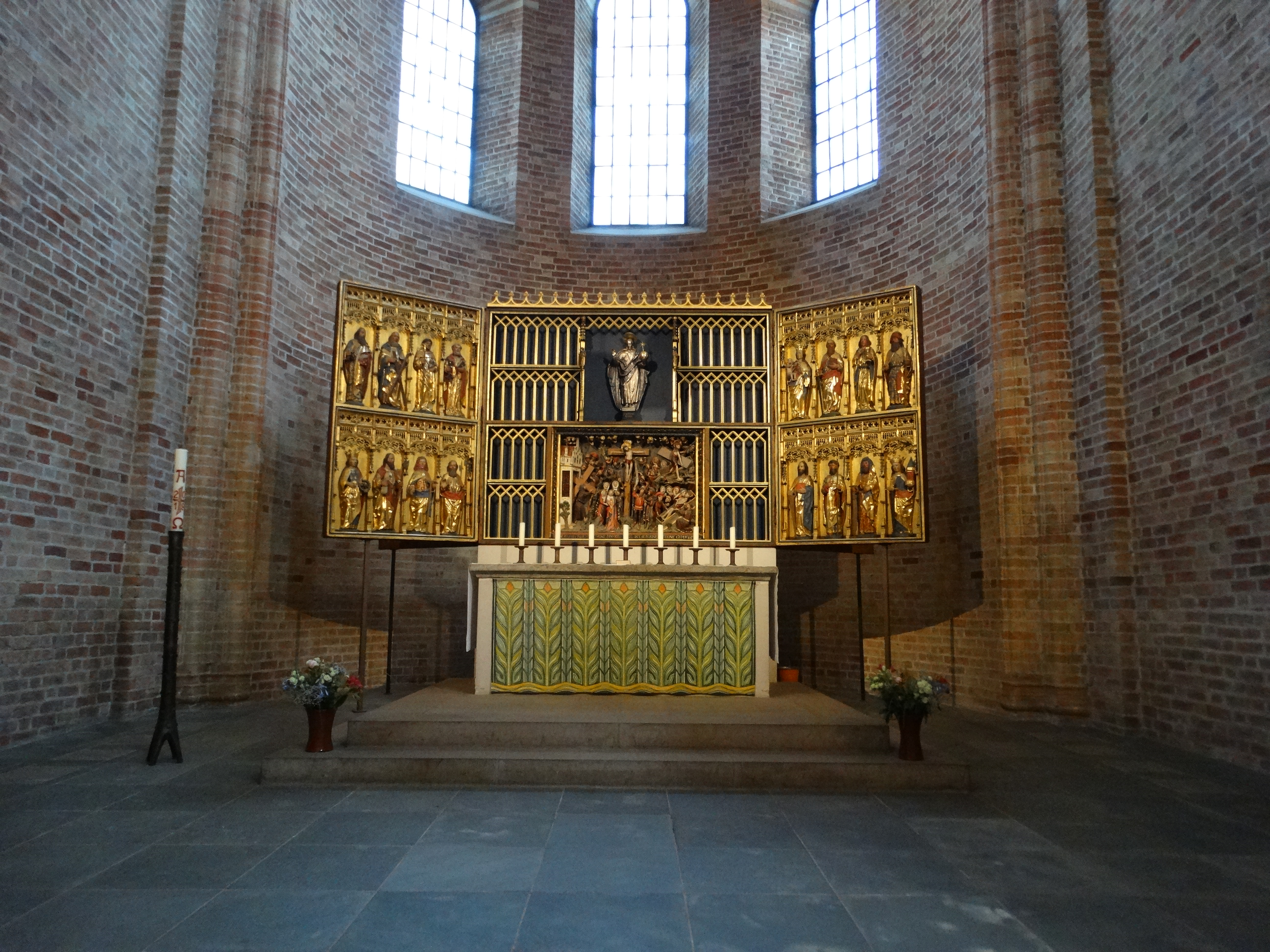
Altar of the Ratzeburg Cathedral

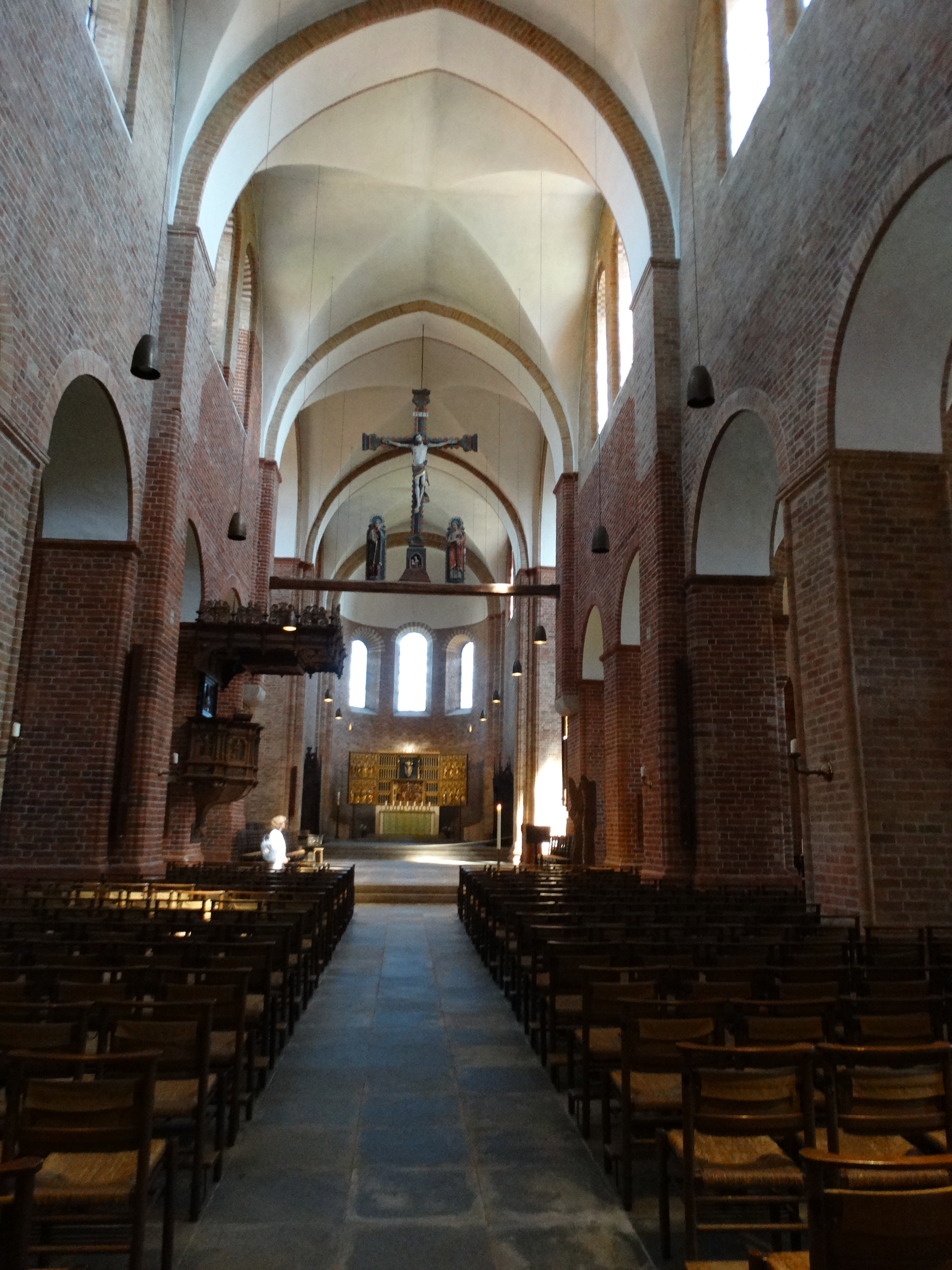
Ratzeburg Cathedral (inner view)

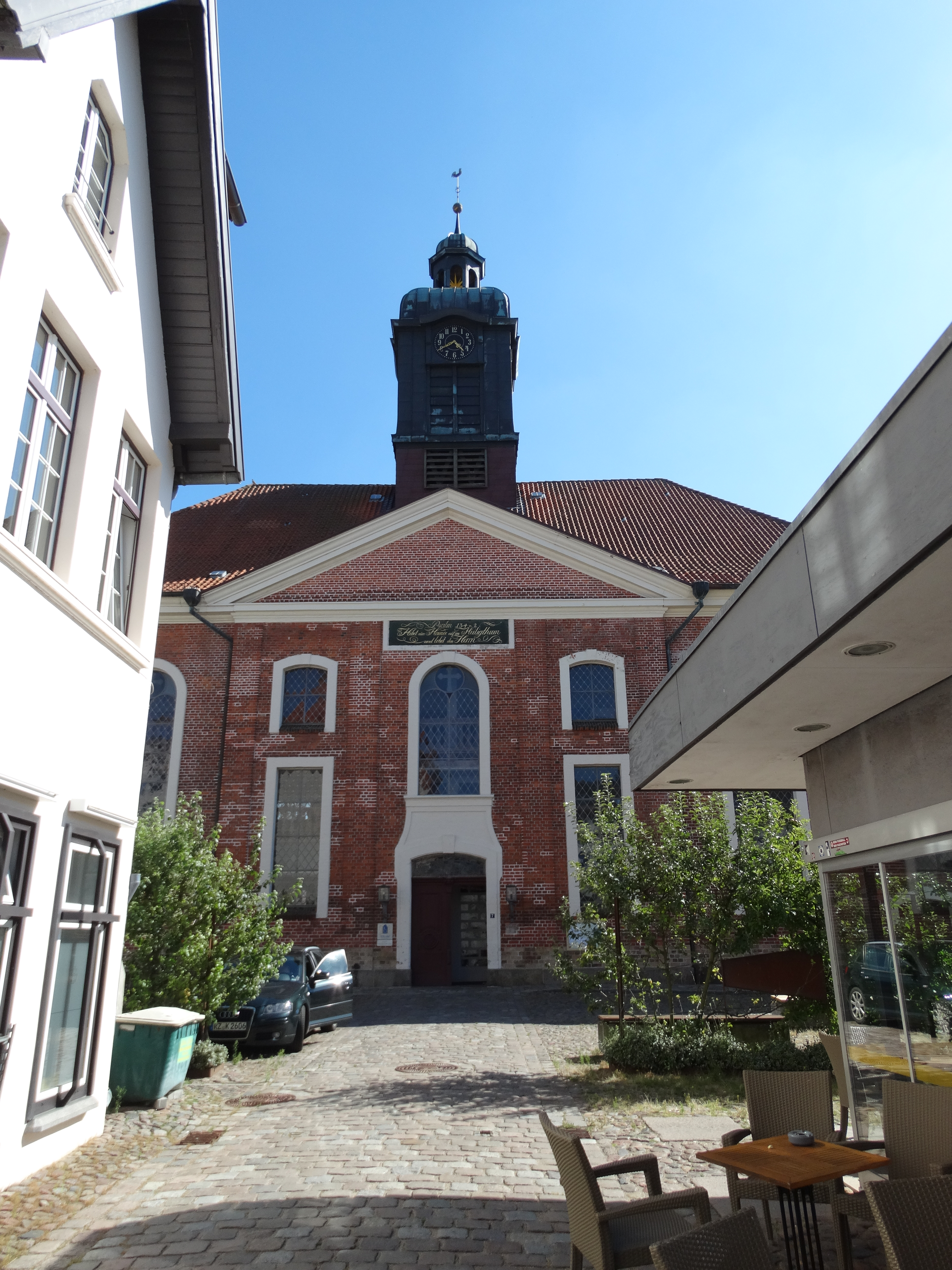
St. Peter Church

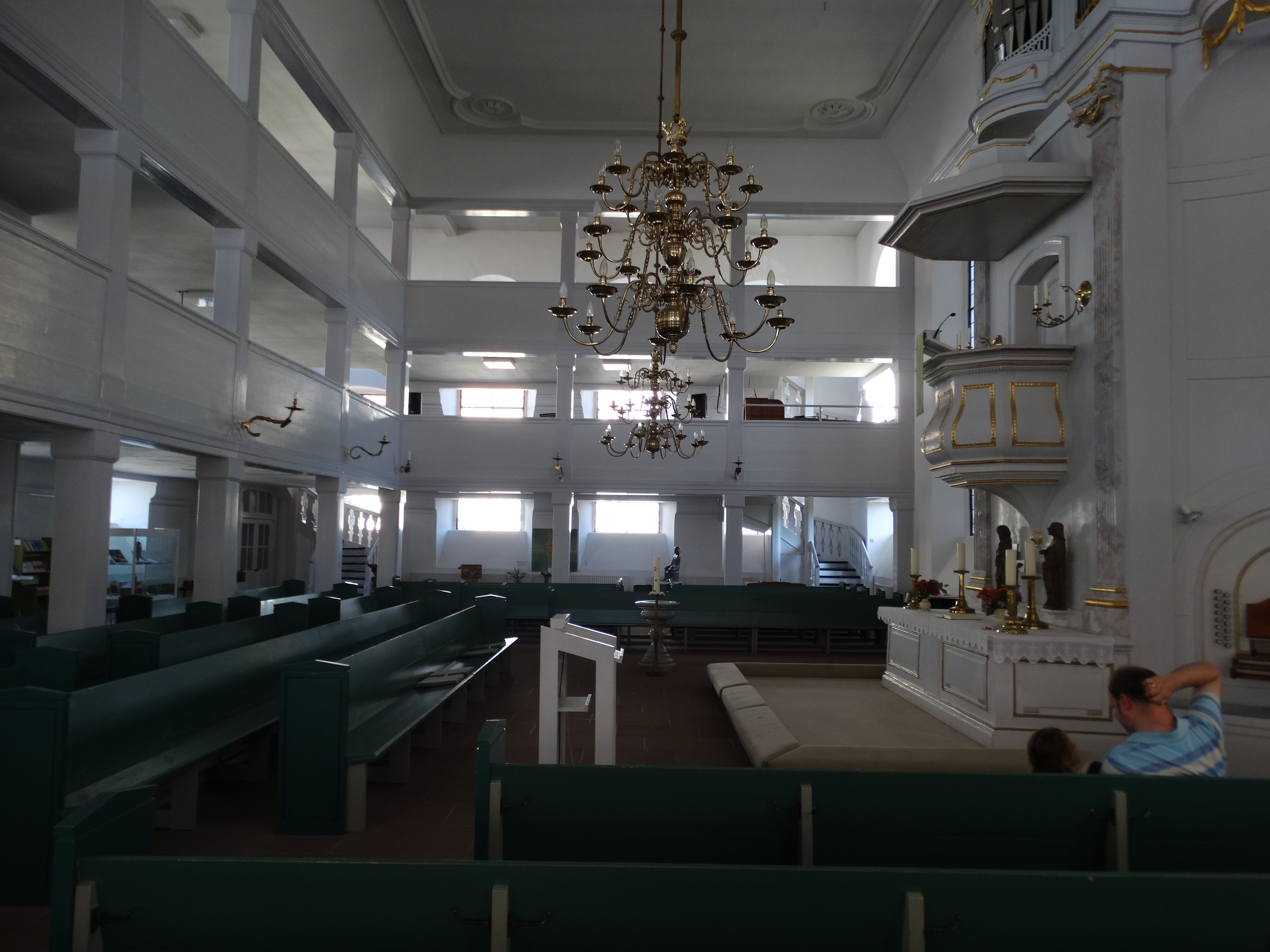
St. Peter Church(inner view)

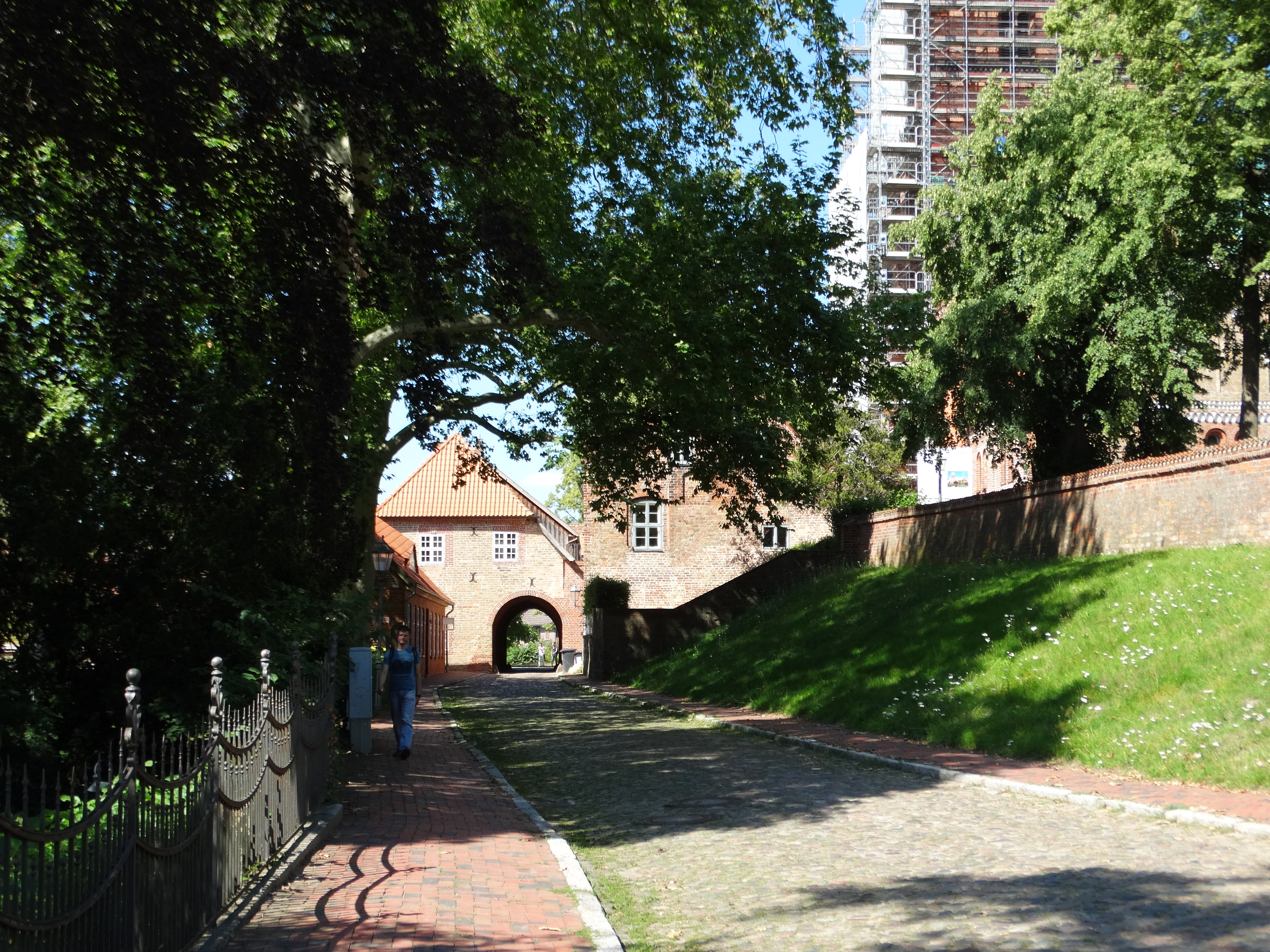
The gate to the Cathedral
