= Exercise intensity =

Amount of energy expended when exercising

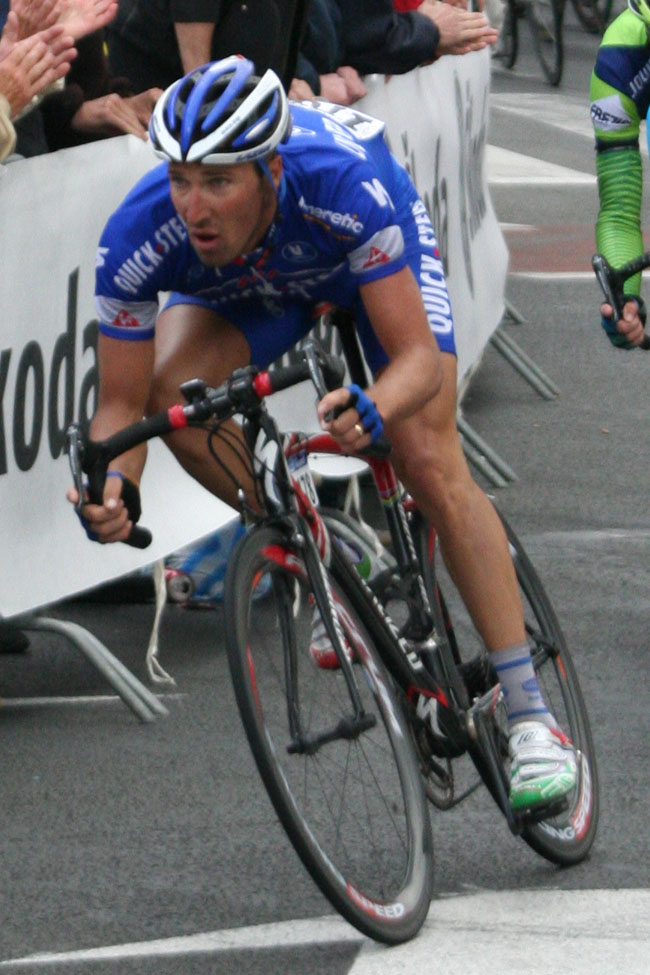

Exercise intensity refers to how much energy is expended when exercising. Perceived intensity varies with each person. It has been found that intensity has an effect on what fuel the body uses and what kind of adaptations the body makes after exercise. Intensity is the amount of physical power (expressed as a percentage of the maximal oxygen consumption) that the body uses when performing an activity. For example, exercise intensity defines how hard the body has to work to walk a mile in 20 minutes.

== Measures of Intensity ==
Heart Rate is typically used as a measure of exercise intensity. Heart rate can be an indicator of the challenge to the cardiovascular system that the exercise represents.

The most precise measure of intensity is oxygen consumption (VO_{2}). VO_{2} represents the overall metabolic challenge that an exercise imposes. There is a direct linear relationship between intensity of aerobic exercise and VO_{2}. Our maximum intensity is a reflection of our maximal oxygen consumption (VO_{2} max). Such a measurement represents a cardiovascular fitness level.

VO_{2} is measured in METs (mL/kg/min). One MET, which is equal to 3.5 mL/kg per minute, is considered to be the average resting energy expenditure of a typical human being. Intensity of exercise can be expressed as multiples of resting energy expenditure. An intensity of exercise equivalent to 6 METs means that the energy expenditure of the exercise is six times the resting energy expenditure.

Intensity of exercise can be expressed in absolute or relative terms. For example, two individuals with different measures of VO_{2} max, running at 7 mph are running at the same absolute intensity (miles/hour) but a different relative intensity (% of VO_{2} max expended). The individual with the higher VO_{2} max is running at a lower intensity at this pace than the individual with the lower VO_{2} max is.

Some studies measure exercise intensity by having subjects perform exercise trials to determine peak power output, which may be measured in watts, heart rate, or average cadence (cycling). This approach attempts to gauge overall workload.

An informal method to determine optimal exercise intensity is the talk test. It states that exercise intensity is “just about right”, when the subject can “just respond to conversation.” The talk test results in similar exercise intensity as the ventilatory threshold and is suitable for exercise prescription.

== Intensity Levels ==
Exercise is categorized into three different intensity levels. These levels include low, moderate, and vigorous and are measured by the metabolic equivalent of task (aka metabolic equivalent or METs). The effects of exercise are different at each intensity level (i.e. training effect). Recommendations to lead a healthy lifestyle vary for individuals based on age, weight, and existing activity levels. “Published guidelines for healthy adults state that 20-60 minutes of medium intensity continuous or intermittent aerobic activity 3-5 times per week is needed for developing and maintaining cardiorespiratory fitness, body composition, and muscular strength.”

Physical Activity	MET
Light Intensity Activities	< 3
sleeping	0.9
watching television	1.0
writing, desk work, typing	1.8
walking, 1.7 mph (2.7 km/h), level ground, strolling, very slow	2.3
walking, 2.5 mph (4 km/h)	2.9
Moderate Intensity Activities	3 to 6
bicycling, stationary, 50 watts, very light effort	3.0
walking 3.0 mph (4.8 km/h)	3.3
calisthenics, home exercise, light or moderate effort, general	3.5
walking 3.4 mph (5.5 km/h)	3.6
bicycling, <10 mph (16 km/h), leisure, to work or for pleasure	4.0
bicycling, stationary, 100 watts, light effort	5.5
Vigorous Intensity Activities	> 6
jogging, general	7.0
calisthenics (e.g. pushups, situps, pullups, jumping jacks), heavy, vigorous effort	8.0
running jogging, in place	8.0
rope jumping	10.0

== Fuel Used ==
The body uses different amounts of energy substrates (carbohydrates or fats) depending on the intensity of the exercise and the VO2 Max of the exerciser. Protein is a third energy substrate, but it contributes minimally (around 3% of the total energy expenditure during exercise) and is therefore discounted in the percent contribution graphs reflecting different intensities of exercise. The fuel provided by the body dictates an individual's capacity to increase the intensity level of a given activity. In other words, the intensity level of an activity determines the order of fuel recruitment. Specifically, exercise physiology dictates that low intensity, long duration exercise provides a larger percentage of fat contribution in the calories burned because the body does not need to quickly and efficiently produce energy (i.e., adenosine triphosphate) to maintain the activity. On the other hand, high intensity activity utilizes a larger percentage of carbohydrates in the calories expended because its quick production of energy makes it the preferred energy substrate for high intensity exercise. High intensity activity also yields a higher total caloric expenditure.

VO2 max acts as a key determinant of fuel usage during exercise. Higher VO2 Max individuals can sustain higher intensities in the "fat-burning zone" before shifting to carbohydrates, enhancing their endurance and efficiency.

This table outlines the estimated distribution of energy consumption at different percentages of VO2 Max.

Intensity (% of VO_{2} Max)	% Fat	% Carbohydrate	Fuel Usage
25	85	15	Most energy from fatty acids.
65	50	50	Equal contribution from fatty acids, and carbohydrates.
85	40	60	Decreased fatty acid usage, high reliance on carbohydrates.

These estimates are valid only when glycogen reserves are able to cover the energy needs. If a person depletes their glycogen reserves after a long workout (a phenomenon known as "hitting the wall"), the body will use mostly fat for energy (known as "second wind"). Ketones, produced by the liver, will slowly buildup in concentration in the blood, the longer that the person's glycogen reserves have been depleted, typically due to starvation or a low carb diet (βHB 3 - 5 mM). Prolonged aerobic exercise, where individuals "hit the wall" can create post-exercise ketosis; however, the level of ketones produced are smaller (βHB 0.3 - 2 mM).

Exercise intensity (%W_{max}) and substrate use in skeletal muscle during aerobic activity (cycling)
		Exercise intensity (W_{Max})			
		At rest	40%W_{max} Very low-intensity	55%W_{max} Low-intensity	75%W_{max} Moderate-intensity
Percent of substrate contribution to total energy expenditure	Plasma glucose	44%	10%	13%	18%
Percent of substrate contribution to total energy expenditure	Muscle glycogen	-	35%	38%	58%
Percent of substrate contribution to total energy expenditure	Plasma free fatty acids	56%	31%	25%	15%
Percent of substrate contribution to total energy expenditure	Other fat sources (intramuscular and lipoprotein-derived triglycerides)	-	24%	24%	9%
Percent of substrate contribution to total energy expenditure	Total	100%	100%	100%	100%
Total energy expenditure (kJ min^{−1})		10	50	65	85

== High Intensity Exercise in Pregnancy ==
The Centers for Disease Control and Prevention (CDC) recommends that pregnant women engage in at least 150 minutes of moderate-intensity exercise weekly to promote maternal and fetal health. Different parameters for high-intensity exercise have been researched to educate and determine their safety for the mother and fetus.

Studies support that an acute bout of high-intensity exercise in active pregnant women does not lead to fetal distress or adverse effects. Results were also similar in maternal and fetal responses to moderate-intensity and high-intensity training. Both intensity exercises were associated with normal maternal and fetal cerebral blood flow responses. It also showed healthy circulation in the fetus and mother, demonstrating vasodilation and improved placental perfusion.

Current evidence suggests that high-intensity exercises may be well-tolerated by healthy, active pregnant women in their late second and third trimesters. The frequency, type, time, and volume of these exercises should be individually tailored to the patient, prescribed, and conducted by medical professionals and exercise specialists. Pregnant women are also advised not to participate in activities that will increase their heart rate to above 90% of their known maximum heart rate.

== See also ==
- Exercise physiology
- Human power
- Bioenergetic systems
