= Exercise-induced nausea =

Feeling of sickness after exercising

Exercise-induced nausea is a feeling of sickness or vomiting which can occur shortly after exercise has stopped as well as during exercise itself. It may be a symptom of either over-exertion during exercise, or from too abruptly ending an exercise session. People engaged in high-intensity exercise such as aerobics and bicycling have reported experiencing exercise-induced nausea.

== Cause ==
A study of 20 volunteers conducted at Nagoya University in Japan associated a higher degree of exercise-induced nausea after eating.

Lack of hydration during exercise is a well known cause of headache and nausea. Exercising at a heavy rate causes blood flow to be taken away from the stomach, causing nausea.

Another possible cause of exercise induced nausea is overhydration. Drinking too much water before, during, or after extreme exercise (such as a marathon) can cause nausea, diarrhea, confusion, and muscle tremors. Excessive water consumption reduces or dilutes electrolyte levels in the body causing hyponatremia.

== See also ==
- Exercise intolerance
- Exercise-induced bronchoconstriction
- Exercise-induced urticaria
- Exercise-associated hyponatremia
- Heat intolerance
- Ventilatory threshold
