= Zone 2 =

Zone 2 may refer to:

- London fare zone 2, of the Transport for London zonal system
- Hardiness zone, a geographically defined zone in which a specific category of plant life is capable of growing
- Zone 2 training, a method of training in endurance sports
- Zone 2 of Milan, Italy
- Zone 2, Rodrigues, Mauritius
- Zone 2 (rap group), UK drill collective based in London
