= Zone 2 training =

Low-intensity endurance exercise performed within a training intensity zone

Zone 2 training is a form of low-intensity endurance exercise performed at an intensity intended to predominantly use aerobic metabolism. The term is widely used in endurance sports and exercise training, including running, cycling and triathlon. Depending on the system used to prescribe exercise intensity, Zone 2 may refer to a particular range of heart rate, power, pace or perceived exertion. There is no universally accepted definition of Zone 2, although a commonly used five-zone model defines it as approximately 60–70% of maximum heart rate.

The idea behind Zone 2 training is to increase aerobic performance, mainly by increasing mitochondrial density and fat oxidation, which can contribute to a higher power output or faster pace at a similar heart rate and rating of perceived exertion (RPE).

When exercising in Zone 2:

- Free fatty acids (fat) are the principal fuel source
- Slow-twitch type I muscle fibers are predominantly recruited
- Lactate is cleared at approximately the same rate as it is produced

== See also ==
- Aerobic exercise
- Endurance training
- Exercise physiology
- Lactate threshold
- Ventilatory threshold
- VO_{2} max
