= Belize Electricity Limited =

- Type: Electric Utility Company
- Industry: Electricity distribution
- Founded: 1950
- Headquarters: Belize City, Belize
- Key people: John Mencias, CEO
- Products: Electricity
- Revenue: $247.7 million (2019)
- Number of employees: 316 (2017)
- Website: Belize Electricity Limited

Belize Electricity Limited (BEL) is the primary distributor of electricity in Belize, Central America.

Aggregate energy sold was approximately 588.4 gigawatt hours (GWh) in 2019, up from 554.4 GWh in 2018. The Company served a customer base of over 100,000 accounts, an increase of over 1100 accounts in 2018, with a peak power demand of approximately 105.6 megawatts (MW) during the year.

BEL’s national electricity grid connects all major municipalities (load centers), except for Caye Caulker, with approximately 1,900 miles of transmission and primary distribution lines. Caye Caulker is server by an off-grid power station.

The grid is primarily supplied by local Independent Power Producers (IPP) utilizing hydroelectricity, biomass, petroleum and solar energy sources, and is secured and stabilized by the interconnection with Mexico. BEL also operates a gas turbine plant as a standby plant for energy security and reliability. As of 2019, 58.6% of electrical production was renewable, making Belize the number one renewable energy producer (by percentage produced) in the Caribbean.

The Government of Belize is the largest shareholder in BEL, with direct ownership of 32.58% interest in the Company. The Social Security Board owns 31.27% interest in the Company, so that the public sector interest amounts to 63.85%. Fortis Inc. owns 33.30%, and over 1,500 small shareholders own the remaining 2.85% interest in ordinary shares.
