= Rating of perceived exertion =

Scale of perceived exhaustion

In sports, health, and exercise testing, the rating of perceived exertion (RPE), as measured by the Borg rating of perceived exertion scale, is a quantitative measure of perceived exertion during physical activity.

In medicine, this is used to document the patient's exertion during a test for the severity of various diseases. Sports coaches use the scale to assess the intensity of training and competition as well as endurance. The original scale, introduced by Gunnar Borg in the 1960s, rated exertion on a scale of 6-20. Around 1982, a newer category-ratio scale, the Borg CR-10 scale was published. It used a scale from 0-11+. Unfortunately, for research and statistical analysis, the ratings greater than 10 are often times deleted.

Borg stated that the CR10 scale was desirable for clinical diagnosis and severity assessment of breathlessness and dyspnea, chest pain, angina and musculo-skeletal pain. It has been described as being better suited when there is an overriding sensation arising either from a specific area of the body rather than overall exertion, for example, muscle pain, ache or fatigue in the quadriceps or from pulmonary responses during exertion, eg the "Modified Borg" is a variant of the CR10 developed for pulmonary conditions, and the 0-10 pain scale is often seen in medical settings.

One key difference in the CR-10 scale is that the highest level of exertion is not tied to a numerical rating. Another difference noted by some writers is that the rate of increase in exercise intensity within the original scale (6-20) is quite "linear" in nature or proportional throughout, which accurately represents physiologic energy expenditure changes in the body. The newer scale (0-11+), however, is more logrithimic in nature, such that at higher levels of exertion, small increases in exercise intensity are often felt to a much greaster degree than at the lower levels, ie the CR10 scale may better reflect the subjective experience of subjects at the higher levels of exertion. Due to misuses, specific verbal instructions for use of the scale, and for instructions to test subjects, were published in 1998 and again in 2000.

Borg himself expressed concerns in a 2014 paper, that there have been many unauthorized changes to the RPE, eg changes to the text or words within the scale, to suit various interests. He highly discouraged this practice, and recommended that the original verbiage be preserved.

The Borg scale can be compared to other linear scales such as the Likert scale or a visual analogue scale. The sensitivity and reproducibility of the results are broadly very similar, although the Borg scale may outperform the Likert scale in some cases.

== Borg RPE scale ==
The Borg RPE scale is a numerical scale that ranges from 6 to 20, where 6 means "no exertion at all" and 20 means "maximal exertion." When a measurement is taken, a number is chosen from the following scale by an individual that best describes their perceived level of exertion during physical activity.

The scale was constructed to roughly correlate to 10% of heart rate in a healthy 20-year-old. This explains why the rating starts at 6, which would roughly correspond to a resting heart rate at about 60 per minute. In older individuals, the correlation becomes higher than 10% at the high-end of the scale, as maximum heart rate declines with age.

== Borg RPE scale and the external environment ==
More recent research points to that being physically active in outdoor environments, compared to indoors, to a varying degree can lower (23-66 %) the perceived exertion that at a given physiological exercise intensity is connected to in laboratory or other indoor conditions.

Numeral	Perceived exertion rating
6	no exertion
7	extremely light
8	
9	very light
10	
11	light
12	moderate
13	somewhat hard
14	
15	hard
16	
17	very hard
18	
19	extremely hard
20	maximal exertion

== CR-10 scale ==
Borg later developed a CR10 scale.

Numeral	Perceived exertion rating
0	nothing at all
0.5	minimal
1	very weak
1.5	
2	weak, light
2.5	
3	moderate
4	
5	strong, heavy
6	
7	very strong
8	
9	
10	extremely strong, maximal
11	
*	absolute maximum, highest posssible

== See also ==
- Metabolic equivalent of task
