= Peak power output =

Common measure of exercise intensity

Peak power output (PPO), also known as "peak work rate", is a common measure of exercise intensity. For example, researchers may ask subjects to complete an incremental exercise test where VO_{2}max is measured while the person cycles at increasingly difficult power generation levels as measured by a cycle ergometer.

== See also ==
- Human power
