= Metabolic equivalent of task =

Measure used to describe relative energy expenditure

The metabolic equivalent of task (MET) is the objective measure of the ratio of the rate at which a person expends energy, relative to the mass of that person, while performing some specific physical activity compared to a reference, currently set by convention at an absolute 3.5 mL of oxygen per kg per minute, which is the energy expended when sitting quietly by a reference individual, chosen to be roughly representative of the general population, and thereby suited to epidemiological surveys. A Compendium of Physical Activities is available online, which provides MET values for hundreds of activities.

A primary use of METs is to grade activity levels for common household activities (such as cleaning) and common exercise modalities (such as running). Vigorous household chores can add up to as much energy expenditure as dedicated exercise, so it is necessary to include both, suitably pro rata, in an assessment of general fitness.

An earlier convention defined the MET as a multiple of the resting metabolic rate (RMR) for the individual concerned. An individual's resting metabolic rate can be measured by absolute gas exchange, absolute thermal output, or steady-state diet in a sedentary condition (with no reference to body mass); or it can be estimated from age, sex, height, body mass, and estimated fitness level (which in part functions as a proxy for lean body mass). As a relative measure, it might correlate better with rating of perceived exertion. This definition is more common in colloquial use on the Internet concerning personal fitness, and less common in the recent academic literature. As a relative measure suited to judge exertion level for the individual athlete, many coaches now prefer a measure indexed to maximum heart rate, which is easy to monitor continuously with modern consumer electronics. Exercise equipment with an accurate delivered-wattage indicator permits the use of relative METs for the same purpose, assuming a known ratio of biological efficiency in converting metabolic energy to mechanical energy, commonly estimated as around 25%. A benefit of relative METs over heart rate is that it tracks fairly directly to caloric consumption, and can be used to judge the impact of task exertion on fed or fasted states in various dietary regimes, such as intermittent fasting; fast duration in this context is sometimes denominated in MET⋅hours (effectively RMR⋅hours), where sedentary hours count as unitary.

An alternative convention for the absolute MET replaces the mass of a reference individual with the body surface area of a chosen reference individual.

Health and fitness studies often bracket cohort activity levels in MET⋅hours/week.

== Quantitative definitions ==
=== Based on oxygen utilization and body mass ===
The original definition of metabolic equivalent of task is the oxygen used by a person in milliliters per minute per kilogram body mass divided by 3.5.

Other definitions which roughly produce the same numbers have been devised, such as:

$$\text{1 MET}\
= 1      \, \frac{\text{kcal}}{\text{kg}\times\text{h}}\
= 4.184 \, \frac{\text{kJ}}{\text{kg}\times\text{h}}
= 1.162 \, \frac{\text{W}}{\text{kg}}$$

where

- kcal = kilocalorie
- kg = kilogram
- h = hour
- kJ = kilojoule
- W = watt

=== Based on watts produced and body surface area ===
Still another definition is based on the body surface area, BSA, and energy itself, where the BSA is expressed in m^{2}:

$$\text{1 MET}\
= 58.2 \, \frac{\text{J}}{\text{s}\times\text{BSA}}\
= 58.2 \, \frac{\text{W}}{\text{m}^2}
= 18.4 \, \frac{\text{Btu}}{\text{h}\times\text{ft}^2}$$

which is equal to the rate of energy produced per unit surface area of an average person seated at rest. The BSA of an average person is 1.8 m^{2} (19 ft^{2}). Metabolic rate is usually expressed in terms of the unit area of the total body surface (ANSI/ASHRAE Standard 55).

=== Based on resting metabolic rate ===
Originally, 1 MET was considered as the resting metabolic rate (RMR) obtained during quiet sitting.

Although the RMR of any person may deviate from the reference value, MET can be thought of as an index of the intensity of activities: for example, an activity with a MET value of 2, such as walking at a slow pace (e.g., 3 km/h) would require twice the energy that an average person consumes at rest (e.g., sitting quietly).

== Use ==
MET: The ratio of the work metabolic rate to the resting metabolic rate. One MET is defined as 1 kcal/kg/hour and is roughly equivalent to the energy cost of sitting quietly. A MET also is defined as oxygen uptake in ml/kg/min with one MET equal to the oxygen cost of sitting quietly, equivalent to 3.5 ml/kg/min. The MET concept was primarily designed to be used in epidemiological surveys, where survey respondents answer the amount of time they spend on specific physical activities. MET is used to provide general medical thresholds and guidelines to a population. A MET is the ratio of the rate of energy expended during an activity to the rate of energy expended at rest. For example, 1 MET is the rate of energy expenditure while at rest. A 4 MET activity expends 4 times the energy used by the body at rest. If a person does a 4 MET activity for 30 minutes, he or she has done 4 x 30 = 120 MET-minutes (or 2.0 MET-hours) of physical activity. A person could also achieve 120 MET-minutes by doing an 8 MET activity for 15 minutes.

In a systematic review of physical activity and major chronic diseases, a meta‐analysis of an 11.25 MET h/week increase in physical activity was associated with a 23% lower risk of cardiovascular disease mortality (0.77 relative risk (RR), 95% confidence interval (CI), 0.71-0.84), and 26% lower risk of type 2 diabetes (0.74 RR, 95% CI, 0.72-0.77).

== Exercise guidelines ==
The American College of Sports Medicine and American Heart Association guidelines count periods of at least 10 minutes of moderate MET level activity towards their recommended daily amounts of exercise. For healthy adults aged 18 to 65, the guidelines recommend moderate exercise for 30 minutes five days a week, or vigorous aerobic exercise for 20 minutes three days a week.

== Reference values ==
=== Activities ===
Physical activity	MET (Note: defined as 3.5 mL of oxygen per kg per minute per MET)
Light-intensity activities	< 3
Writing, desk work, using computer	1.5
Walking slowly	2.0
Moderate-intensity activities	3 to 6
Walking, 3.0 mph (4.8 km/h)	3.0
Sweeping or mopping floors, vacuuming carpets	3 to 3.5
Yoga session with asanas and pranayama	3.3
Tennis doubles	5.0
Weight lifting (moderate intensity)	5.0
Sexual activity, aged 22	5.8
Vigorous intensity activities	≥6
Aerobic dancing, medium effort	6.0
Bicycling, on flat, 10–12 mph (16–19 km/h), light effort	6.0
Jumping jacks	>6.0
Football (american)	6 to 7
Sun Salutationln (Surya Namaskar, vigorous with transition jumps)	7.4
Swimming moderately to hard	8 to 11
Basketball game	8.0 to 11.1
Jogging, 5.6 mph (9.0 km/h)	8.8
Rope jumping (66/min)	9.8
Football (soccer)	10.3
Rope jumping (84/min)	10.5
Rope jumping (100/min)	11.0
Jogging, 6.8 mph (10.9 km/h)	11.2
Running, 8.1 mph (13.0 km/h)	12.9
Running, 9.3 mph (15.0 km/h)	14.6
Rowing, 10 mph (16 km/h)	16.4

=== Peak estimated METs percentiles by age and sex group ===
Percentiles of cardiorespiratory fitness, as quantified by peak estimated metabolic equivalents (METs) on treadmill testing, by age and sex
Sex	Age (y)	<25th	25th-49th	50th-74th	75th-97.6th	≥97.7th
Women	18-19	<10.0	10-11.0	11.1-12.9	13-14.9	≥15.0
Women	20-29	<8.0	8.0-9.9	10-11.4	11.5-14.2	≥14.3
Women	30-39	<7.7	7.7-9.3	9.4-10.8	10.9-13.6	≥13.7
Women	40-49	<7.4	7.4-8.9	9.0-10.3	10.4-13.2	≥13.3
Women	50-59	<7.0	7.0-8.0	8.1-9.9	10.0-12.9	≥13.0
Women	60-69	<6.0	6.0-6.9	7.0-8.4	8.5-11.0	≥11.1
Women	70-79	<5.0	5.0-5.9	6.0-6.9	7.0-9.9	≥10.0
Women	≥80	<4.4	4.4-5.4	5.5-6.2	6.3-8.3	≥8.4
Men	18-19	<10.8	10.8-12.9	13.0-13.9	14-16.2	≥16.3
Men	20-29	<10.3	10.3-11.9	12.0-13.6	13.7-15.6	≥15.7
Men	30-39	<10.0	10.0-11.1	11.2-12.9	13.0-14.9	≥15.0
Men	40-49	<9.8	9.8-10.9	11.0-12.4	12.5-14.6	≥14.7
Men	50-59	<8.2	8.2-9.9	10.0-11.3	11.4-13.9	≥14.0
Men	60-69	<7.0	7.0-8.4	8.5-9.9	10.0-12.9	≥13.0
Men	70-79	<6.0	6.0-6.9	7.0-8.4	8.5-11.4	≥11.5
Men	≥80	<5.1	5.1-6.2	6.3-7.2	7.3-9.9	≥10.0

== Limitations ==
The definition of MET is problematic when used for specific persons. By convention, 1 MET is considered equivalent to the consumption of 3.5 ml O_{2}·kg^{−1}·min^{−1} (or 3.5 ml of oxygen per kilogram of body mass per minute) and is roughly equivalent to the expenditure of 1 kcal per kilogram of body weight per hour. This value was first experimentally derived from the resting oxygen consumption of a particular subject (a healthy 40-year-old, 70 kg man) and must therefore be treated as a convention. Since the RMR of a person depends mainly on lean body mass (and not total weight) and other physiological factors such as health status and age, actual RMR (and thus 1-MET energy equivalents) may vary significantly from the kcal/(kg·h) rule of thumb. RMR measurements by calorimetry in medical surveys have shown that the conventional 1-MET value overestimates the actual resting O_{2} consumption and energy expenditures by about 20% to 30% on the average; body composition (ratio of body fat to lean body mass) accounted for most of the variance.

== Standardized definition for research ==
The Compendium of Physical Activities (https://pacompendium.com/) was developed for use in epidemiologic studies to standardize the assignment of MET intensities in physical activity questionnaires. Dr. Bill Haskell from Stanford University conceptualized the compendium and developed a prototype for the document. The compendium was used first in the Survey of Activity, Fitness, and Exercise (SAFE study – 1987 to 1989) to code and score physical activity records. Since then, the compendium has been used in studies worldwide to assign intensity units to physical activity questionnaires and to develop innovative ways to assess energy expenditure in physical activity studies. The compendium was published in 1993 and updated in 2000, 2011, and 2024. The 2024 update included a new Older Adult Compendium and an updated Compendium for Wheelchair Users.

== See also ==
- Anthropogenic metabolism
- Basal metabolic rate
- Calorimetry
- VO2 max
- vVO2max

== Sources ==
- Ainsworth, Barbara E.; Haskell, William L.; Herrmann, Stephen D.; Meckes, Nathanael; Bassett, David R.; Tudor-Locke, Catrine; Greer, Jennifer L.; Vezina, Jesse; Whitt-Glover, Melicia C.; Leon, Arthur S. (2011). "2011 Compendium of Physical Activities". Medicine & Science in Sports & Exercise. 43 (8): 1575–81. doi:10.1249/mss.0b013e31821ece12. PMID 21681120. S2CID 12441350.
- Ainsworth, Barbara E.; Haskell, William L.; Leon, Arthur S.; Jacobs, David R.; Montoye, Henry J.; Sallis, James F.; Paffenbarger, Ralph S. (1993). "Compendium of Physical Activities: Classification of energy costs of human physical activities". Medicine & Science in Sports & Exercise. 25 (1): 71–80. doi:10.1249/00005768-199301000-00011. PMID 8292105.
- Ainsworth, Barbara E.; Haskell, William L.; Whitt, Melicia C.; Irwin, Melinda L.; Swartz, Ann M.; Strath, Scott J.; O'Brien, William L.; Bassett, David R.; Schmitz, Kathryn H.; Emplaincourt, Patricia O.; Jacobs, David R.; Leon, Arthur S. (2000). "Compendium of Physical Activities: An update of activity codes and MET intensities". Medicine & Science in Sports & Exercise. 32 (9 Suppl): S498–504. doi:10.1097/00005768-200009001-00009. PMID 10993420.
- Byrne, Nuala M.; Hills, Andrew P.; Hunter, Gary R.; Weinsier, Roland L.; Schutz, Yves (2005). "Metabolic equivalent: One size does not fit all". Journal of Applied Physiology. 99 (3): 1112–9. Bibcode:2005JAPh...99.1112B. doi:10.1152/japplphysiol.00023.2004. PMID 15831804. S2CID 11895307.
- Frappier, J.; Toupin, I.; Levy, J.J.; Aubertin-Leheudre, M.; Karelis, A.D. (2013). "Energy Expenditure during Sexual Activity in Young Healthy Couples". PLoS ONE. 8 (10) e79342. Bibcode:2013PLoSO...879342F. doi:10.1371/journal.pone.0079342. PMC 3812004. PMID 24205382.
- Manore, Melinda; Thompson, Janice (2000). Sport Nutrition for Health and Performance. Human Kinetics. ISBN 978-0-87322-939-5.
- Royall, Penelope Slade; Troiano, Richard P.; Johnson, Melissa A.; Kohl, Harold W.; Fulton, Janet E. (2008). "Appendix 1. Translating Scientific Evidence About Total Amount and Intensity of Physical Activity Into Guidelines". 2008 Physical Activity Guidelines for Americans. United States Department of Health and Human Services. pp. 54–7.
- Savage, Patrick D.; Toth, Michael J.; Ades, Philip A. (2007). "A Re-examination of the Metabolic Equivalent Concept in Individuals With Coronary Heart Disease". Journal of Cardiopulmonary Rehabilitation and Prevention. 27 (3): 143–8. doi:10.1097/01.HCR.0000270693.16882.d9. PMID 17558194. S2CID 8276706.
- Sotile, Wayne M.; Cantor-Cooke, R. (2003). Thriving with Heart Disease: A Unique Program for You and Your Family. Simon and Schuster. pp. 161–2. ISBN 978-0-7432-4364-3.
- Global Recommendations on Physical Activity for Health. World Health Organization. 2010. ISBN 978-92-4-159997-9.
