= Ventilatory threshold =

Concept in kinesiology

In kinesiology, the ventilatory threshold (VT1) refers to the point during exercise at which the volume of air breathed out (expiratory ventilation) starts to increase at an exponentially greater rate than VO_{2} (breath-by-breath volume of oxygen (O_{2})). VT1 is thought to reflect a person's anaerobic threshold — the point at which the oxygen supplied to the muscles no longer meets its oxygen requirements at a given work rate — and therefore lactate threshold — the point at which lactate begins to accumulate in the blood, because with ongoing dependence on anaerobic glycolysis, increasing amounts of CO2 need to be exhaled to accommodate its production during the conversion of lactic acid to lactate.

As the intensity level of the activity being performed increases, breathing becomes faster; more steadily first and then more rapid as the intensity increases. When breathing surpasses normal ventilation rate, one has reached ventilatory threshold. For most people this threshold lies at exercise intensities between 50% and 75% of VO_{2} max. A major factor affecting one's ventilatory threshold is their maximal ventilation (amount of air entering and exiting lungs). This is dependent on their personal experience with the activity and how physically fit the person is. Comparison studies of more athletic people have shown that your ventilatory threshold occurs at a higher intensity if you are more active or have been training for that exercise; although, in some cases shorter continuous tests can be used because of rapid alterations in ventilation.

== Methods ==
- Ventilation Curve – Plot VE vs. VO_{2} or Watts or Time – The point at which there is a non‐linear increase in ventilation
- V‐Slope Method – Plot VO_{2} vs. VCO_{2} – The point at which the increase in VCO_{2} is greater than the increase in VO_{2}
- Ventilatory Equivalents Method – Plot VE/VO_{2} and VE/VCO_{2} vs. Watts or time or VO_{2} – Point at which VE/VO_{2} increases while VE/VCO_{2} decreases or stays the same.

== Sample values ==
Frangolias DD, Rhodes EC School of Human Kinetics, University of British Columbia, Vancouver, Canada. Medicine and Science in Sports and Exercise [1995, 27(7):1007-1013]:

A government experiment to test ventilatory threshold was held between November and December 2004. Subjects included 32 physically active males (age: 22.3; TV: 180.5; TM: 75.5 kg; VO2max: 57.1 mL/kg/min) encountered a continuous test of increasing loads on a treadmill, cardiorespiratory and other variables were observed using ECG (recording of the electrical activity of the heart) and gas analyzer. During the test, subjects were asked to point at a scale from 6 to 20 reflecting their feeling of discomfort. The RPE threshold was recorded as constant value of 12-13. Averages of ventilatory and RPE threshold were conveyed by parameters that were monitored and then compared by using t-test for dependent samples. No significant difference was found between mean values of ventilatory and RPE threshold, when they were expressed by parameters such as: speed, load, heart rate, absolute and relative oxygen consumption. The conclusion of this experiment was: the fixed value (12-13) of RPE scale may be used to detect the exercise intensity that corresponds to ventilatory threshold.

== VO_{2} max levels ==
Maximum oxygen intake, VO_{2}, is one of the best measures of cardiovascular fitness and maximal aerobic power. VO_{2} max averages around 35–40 mL/(kg∙ min) in a healthy male and 27–31 mL/ (kg∙ min) in a healthy female. These scores can improve with training. Factors that affect your VO_{2} max are age, sex, fitness, training, and genetics. While scores in the upper 80s and 90s have been recorded by legendary endurance athletes such as Greg LeMond, Miguel Indurain, and Steve Prefontaine, most competitive endurance athletes have scores in the mid to high 60s. Cycling, rowing, swimming and running are some of the main sports that push VO_{2} levels to the maximum. Ventilatory threshold and lactate threshold are expressed as a percentage of VO_{2} max; beyond this percentage the ability to sustain the work rate rapidly declines as high intensity but short duration energy systems such as glycolysis and ATP-PC are relied on more heavily.

== See also ==
- Anaerobic exercise
- Lactate threshold
- VO_{2} max
