= Health management system =

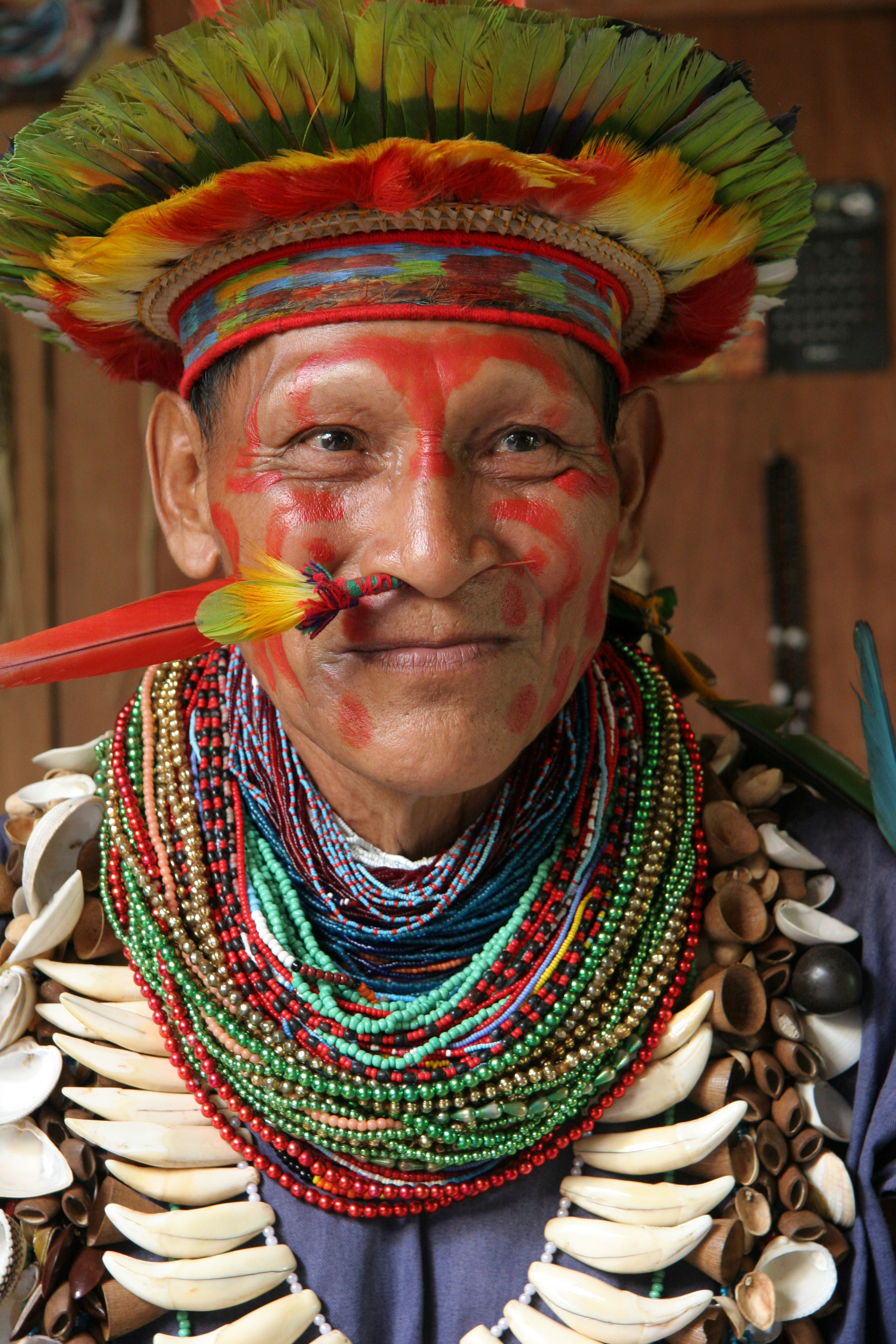
A shaman from the Amazon rainforest: the health management system uses information about being treated from healers to limit the deployment of the body's own evolved self-treatments such as fever, sickness behavior, and pain.

The health management system (HMS) is an evolutionary medicine regulative process proposed by Nicholas Humphrey in which actuarial assessment of fitness and economic-type cost–benefit analysis determine the body's regulation of its physiology and health. The incorporation of the cost–benefit calculations into body regulation provides a science grounded approach to mind–body phenomena such as placebos, are otherwise not explainable by low level, noneconomic, and purely feedback based homeostatic or allostatic theories.

- Many medical symptoms such as inflammation, fever, pain, sickness behavior, or morning sickness have an evolutionary medicine function of enabling the body to protect, heal or restore itself from injury, infection or other physiological disruption.
- The deployment of self-treatments have costs as well as benefits with the result that evolution has selected management processes in the brain such that self-treatments are used only when they provide an overall cost–benefit advantage. The brain controls such physiological process through top–down regulation.
- External treatment and the availability of support is factored into the health management system's cost–benefit assessment as to whether to deploy or not an evolved self-treatment.

Placebos are explained as the result of false information about the availability of external treatment and support that mislead the health management system into not deploying evolved self-treatments. This results in the placebo suppression of medical symptoms.

== Evolutionary medicine ==
Since Hippocrates, it has been recognized that the body has self-healing powers (vis medicatrix naturae). Modern evolutionary medicine identifies them with physiologically based self-treatments that provide the body with prophylactic, healing, or restorative capabilities against injuries, infections and physiological disruption. Examples include:

- Immune responses
- Fever
- Sickness behavior
- Nausea
- Morning sickness
- Diarrhea
- Hypoferremia
- Depression
- Pain

These evolved self-treatments deployed by the body are experienced by humans as unpleasant and unwanted illness symptoms.

== Deployment ==
Such self-treatments according to evolutionary medicine are deployed to increase an individual's biological fitness.

Two factors affect their deployment.

First, it is usually advantageous to deploy them on a precautionary basis. As a result, it will often turn out that they have been deployed apparently unnecessarily, though this has in fact been advantageous since in probabilistic terms they have provided an insurance against a potentially costly outcome. As Nesse notes: "Vomiting, for example, may cost only a few hundred calories and a few minutes, whereas not vomiting may result in a 5% chance of death" page 77.

Second, self-treatments are costly both in using energy, and also in their risk of damaging the body.

- Immunity – energy for activating lymphocyte and antibody production, and in the risk of an immune response resulting in an immune related disorder.
- Fever – energy (each 1 °C raise in blood temperature increases energy expenditure by 10–15%. 90% of the total cost of fighting pneumonia goes on increased body temperature. There is also the risk of hyperpyrexia.
- Sickness behavior – restricted ability by an animal to forage and defend itself
- Nausea – loss of food nutrients, and potential risk of aspiration
- Morning sickness – loss of food nutrients when a mother needs additional, not less, nourishment
- Hypoferremia – impairment in biological processes needing iron resulting in iron deficiency anemia
- Depression – impaired activity and problem solving.
- Pain – restricted movement and the inability to concentrate

One factor in deployment is low level physiological control by proinflammatory cytokines such as IL-1 triggered by bacterial lipopolysaccharides (LPS).

Another is higher level control in which the brain takes into account what it learns about circumstances and how that makes it well and ill. Conditioning shows the existence of such learnt control: give saccharin paired in a drink with a drug that creates immunosuppression, and later on, giving saccharin alone will produce immunosuppression. Such conditioning happens both in experimental rodents and humans.

== Cost benefit analysis ==
=== Economic resource management ===
Evolution, according to Nicholas Humphrey, has selected an internal health management system that uses cost benefit analysis upon whether the deployment of a self-treatment aids biological fitness, and so should be activated.

a specially designed procedure for "economic resource management" that is, I believe, one of the key features of the "natural health-care service" which has evolved in ourselves and other animals to help us deal throughout our lives with repeated bouts of sickness, injury, and other threats to our well-being.

An analogy is explicitly made with the health economics consideration used in management decisions involving external medical treatment.

Now, if you wonder about this choice of managerial terminology for talking about biological healing systems, I should say that it is quite deliberate (and so is the pun on NHS.) With the phrase "natural health-care service" I do intend to evoke, at a biological level, all the economic connotations that are so much a part of modern health-care in society.

=== External medications ===
External medications will affect the cost benefits advantages of deploying an evolved self-treatment. Some animals use external ones. Wild animals, including apes, do so in the form of ingested detoxifying clays, rough leaves that clear gut parasites, and pharmacologically active plants Complementary to this, research finds that animals have the ability to select and prefer substances that aid their recuperation from illness.

=== Social support ===
The welfare of social animals (including humans) depends upon other individuals (social buffering). The actuarial assessments of the costs and benefits of deploying a self-treatment therefore will depend upon the presence, or not, of other individuals. The presence of helpful others will affect, for example, the risk of predators when incapacitated, and—in those case in which animals do this (such as humans)—the provision of food, and care during sickness.

The health management system factors in the presence of such external treatment and social support as one aspect of the circumstances needed to determine whether it is advantageous to deploy or not an evolved self-treatment.

== Placebos ==
=== False information ===
All humans societies use external medications, and some individuals exist that are considered to have special healing knowledge about illnesses and their treatments. Humans are also usually supportive to those in their group. The availability of these things will affect the cost benefits of the body deploying its own biological ones. This could, in turn, lead to the health management system (given its beliefs (information) about treatments and support) to deploy or not, or doing so differently, the body's own treatments.

Nicholas Humphrey describes how the health management system explains placebos – an external treatment without direct physiological effects – as follows:

Suppose, for example, a doctor gives someone who is suffering an infection a pill that she rightly believes to contain an antibiotic: because her hopes will be raised she will no doubt make appropriate adjustments to her health-management strategy – lowering her precautionary defences in anticipation of the sickness not lasting long.

The health management system, in other words, when faced with an infection is tricked into making a mistaken cost benefit analysis using false information. The effect of that false information is that the benefits of the self-treatment cease to outweigh its costs. As a result, it is not deployed, and an individual does not experience unwanted medical symptoms.

=== Lack of harm ===
Failure to deploy an evolved self-treatment need not put an individual at risk since evolution has advantaged their deployment on a precautionary basis. As Nicholas Humphrey notes:

many of the health-care measures we've been discussing are precautionary measures designed to protect from dangers that lie ahead in an uncertain future. Pain is a way of making sure you give your body rest just in case you need it. Rationing the use of the immune system is a way of making sure you have the resources to cope with renewed attacks just in case they happen. Your healing systems are basically tending to be cautious, and sometimes over-cautious, as if working on the principle of better safe than sorry.

Therefore, not deploying an evolved self-treatment, and so not having a medical symptom due to placebo false information might be without consequence.

== Central governor ==
The health management system's idea of a top down neural control of the body is also found in the idea that a central governor regulates muscle fatigue to protect the body from the harmful effects (such as anoxia and hyperglycemia) of over prolonged exercise.

The idea of a fatigue governor was first proposed in 1924 by the 1922 Nobel Prize winner Archibald Hill, and more recently, on the basis of modern research, by Tim Noakes.

Like with the health management system, the central governor shares the idea that much of what is attributed to low level feedback homeostatic regulation is, in fact, due to top down control by the brain. The advantage of this top down management is that the brain can enhance such regulation by allowing it to be modified by information. For example, in endurance running, a cost-benefit trade-off exists between the advantages of continuing to run, and the risk if this is too prolonged that it might harm the body. Being able to regulate fatigue in terms of information about the benefits and costs of continued exercise would enhance biological fitness.

Low level theories exist that suggest that fatigue is due mechanical failure of the exercising muscles ("peripheral fatigue"). However, such low level theories do not explain why running muscle fatigue is affected by information relevant to cost benefit trade offs. For example, marathon runners can carry on running longer if told they are near the finishing line, than far away. The existence of a central governor can explain this effect.

== See also ==
- Central governor
- Deployment cost–benefit selection in physiology
- Evolutionary medicine
- Health science
- Management control system
- Mind–body interventions
- Neural top–down control of physiology
- Placebo effect
- Psychogenic disease
- Psychosomatic medicine
