= Three Principles =

The Three Principles may refer to:

- The Three Principles of the People in Nationalist China
- "The Three Principles of the People", the national anthem of the Republic of China
- The Three Principles of Appeal, an approach towards persuasion
- The Three Principles, an approach to self-help, first articulated by Sydney Banks in the 1970s
