= Hyperalgesia =

Abnormally increased sensitivity to pain

- Specialty: Pain medicine, neurology

Hyperalgesia (/ˌhaɪpərælˈdʒiːziə/ or /-siə/; hyper from Greek ὑπέρ (huper) 'over' + -algesia from Greek ἄλγος (algos) 'pain') is an abnormally increased sensitivity to pain, which may be caused by damage to nociceptors or peripheral nerves and can cause hypersensitivity to stimulus. Prostaglandins E and F are largely responsible for sensitizing the nociceptors. Temporary increased sensitivity to pain also occurs as part of sickness behavior, the evolved response to infection.

== Types ==
Hyperalgesia can be experienced in focal, discrete areas or as a more diffuse, body-wide form. Conditioning studies have established that it is possible to experience a learned hyperalgesia of the latter, diffuse form.

The focal form is typically associated with injury, and is divided into two subtypes:

- Primary hyperalgesia describes pain sensitivity that occurs directly in the damaged tissues.
- Secondary hyperalgesia describes pain sensitivity in surrounding undamaged tissues.

More diffuse, functional hyperalgesia can occur in fibromyalgia. Opioid-induced hyperalgesia may develop as a result of long-term opioid use in the treatment of chronic pain. Various studies of humans and animals have demonstrated that primary or secondary hyperalgesia can develop in response to both chronic and acute exposure to opioids. This side effect can be severe enough to warrant discontinuation of opioid treatment.

== Causes ==
Hyperalgesia is induced by platelet-activating factor (PAF), which comes about in an inflammatory or an allergic response. This seems to occur via immune cells interacting with the peripheral nervous system and releasing pain-producing chemicals (cytokines and chemokines).

One unusual cause of focal hyperalgesia is platypus venom.

Long-term opioid (e.g., heroin, morphine) users and those on high-dose opioid medications for the treatment of chronic pain may experience hyperalgesia and experience pain out of proportion to physical findings; this is a common cause for loss of efficacy of these medications over time. As it can be difficult to distinguish from tolerance, opioid-induced hyperalgesia is often compensated for by escalating the dose of opioid, potentially worsening the problem by further increasing sensitivity to pain. Chronic hyperstimulation of opioid receptors results in altered homeostasis of pain signalling pathways in the body with several mechanisms of action involved, with one major pathway being through stimulation of the nociceptin receptor. Blocking this receptor may therefore be a means of preventing the development of hyperalgesia.

Stimulation of nociceptive fibers in a pattern consistent with that from inflammation switches on a form of amplification in the spinal cord, long term potentiation. This occurs where the pain fibres synapse to the pain pathway, the periaqueductal grey. Amplification in the spinal cord may be another way of producing hyperalgesia.

The release of proinflammatory cytokines such as interleukin-1 by activated leukocytes triggered by lipopolysaccharides, endotoxins and other signals of infection also increases pain sensitivity as part of sickness behavior, the evolved response to illness.

== Medical associations ==
Hyperalgesia is associated with fibromyalgia syndrome.

Simple bedside tests include response (pain intensity and character) to cotton swab, finger pressure, pinprick, cold and warm stimuli, e.g., metal thermo rollers at 20 °C and 40 °C, as well as mapping of the area of abnormality.

Quantitative sensory testing can be used to determine pain thresholds (decreased pain threshold indicates allodynia) and stimulus/response functions (increased pain response indicates hyperalgesia). Dynamic mechanical allodynia can be assessed using a cotton swab or a brush. A pressure algometer and standardized monofilaments or weighted pinprick stimuli are used to evaluate pressure and punctate allodynia and hyperalgesia, and a thermal tester is used for thermal testing.

== Treatment ==
Hyperalgesia is similar to other sorts of pain associated with nerve irritation or damage such as allodynia and neuropathic pain, and consequently may respond to standard treatment for these conditions, using various drugs such as SSRI or tricyclic antidepressants, nonsteroidal anti-inflammatory drugs (NSAIDs), glucocorticoids, gabapentin or pregabalin, NMDA antagonists, and atypical opioids like tramadol. When hyperalgesia has been produced by chronic high doses of opioids, reducing the dose may result in improved pain management. However, as with other forms of nerve dysfunction associated pain, treatment of hyperalgesia can be clinically challenging, and finding a suitable drug or drug combination that is effective for a particular patient may require trial and error. The use of a transcutaneous electrical nerve stimulation device has been shown to alleviate hyperalgesia.

== See also ==
- Allodynia
- Hypoalgesia
