= Sydney Banks (disambiguation) =

Sydney Banks (1917–2006) was a Canadian broadcaster and producer.

Sydney Banks may also refer to:

- Sydney Banks (1931–2009), Scottish-born, Canadian philosopher and author, see Health realization

== See also ==
- Sidney Banks, trainer in the 1947 St James's Place Festival Hunter Chase
- Banks (surname)
