= Paul W. Sherman =

American ethologist, professor emeritus at Cornell University

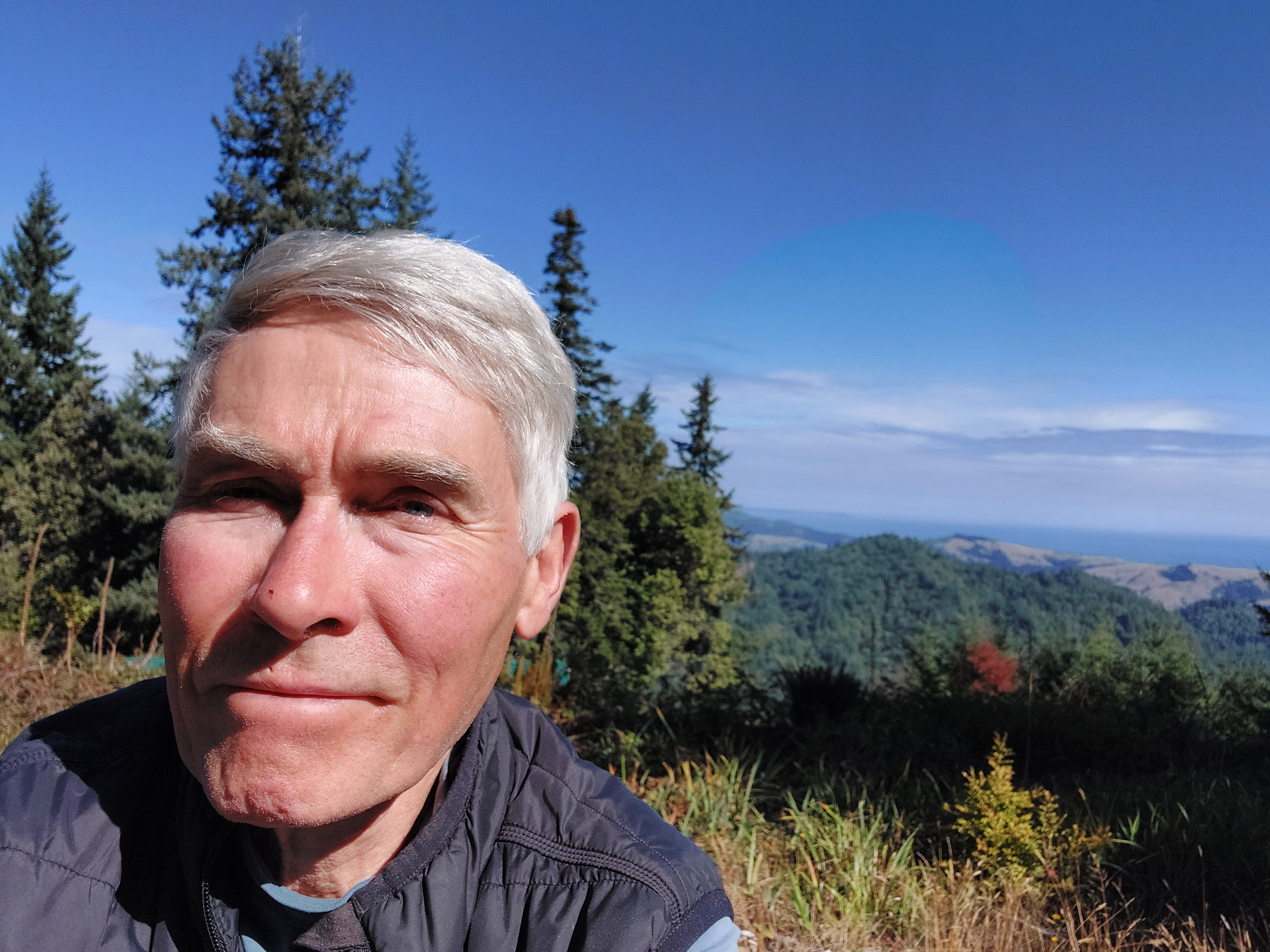
Paul W. Sherman, behavioral ecologist

Paul W. Sherman (born July 6, 1949) is a professor emeritus at Cornell University in animal behaviour. He is best known for his work on the social behavior of rodents (ground squirrels and naked mole rats), eusociality, and evolutionary medicine.

== Biography ==
Sherman received his B.A. from Stanford in 1971, an M.S. in zoology from University of Michigan in 1974, and a Ph.D in 1976. He was a Miller Postdoctoral Fellow at Berkeley from 1976 to 78, and taught there from 1978 to 1981. He joined Cornell's faculty in 1981. In 1984 he was awarded a Guggenheim Fellowship, and in 1985 he received tenure. He was awarded full professorship at Cornell in 1991. He was an Elected Fellow of the Animal Behavior Society, and served as a Sigma Xi Distinguished National Lecturer.

During his career, he published or edited seven books and 195 papers and book chapters, and sponsored or co-sponsored 23 doctoral students and seven postdoctoral students. In 2005 he was awarded the Stephen H. Weiss Presidential Fellowship for "effective, inspiring, and distinguished teaching of undergraduate students."

In 1977, he published evidence that alarm calls by female Belding's ground squirrels function to warn descendant and collateral kin of approaching terrestrial predators (coyotes, badgers, and weasels). In 1996, he published work demonstrating how kin selection in the eusocial naked mole rats affects food allocation.

In 1999, Sherman showed that spices have anti-microbial properties and proposed that the spices used in traditional meat-based cuisines world-wide originally (before refrigeration) served to stave off food-borne pathogens and preserve the food; as a result, people who cooked with spices and liked their tastes were best protected, especially in hot climates. In turn, this may explain the prevalence of spice use in hot climates today.

In 2000, he published support for the hypothesis that morning sickness is an adaptation that protects pregnant mothers and their developing fetuses from foodborne illnesses, some of which can cause miscarriage or birth defects, such as listeriosis and toxoplasmosis.

In 2008, he published work supporting the hypothesis that allergies function as cancer protection mechanisms.

In 2010, Sherman published evidence that bdelloid rotfiers, which present a major evolutionary puzzle because they have reproduced asexually for millions of years, can escape parasites and pathogens by completely drying up (anhydrobiosis) for long periods and dispersing widely on the wind, rather than via sex and genetic recombination like other organisms.

== Bibliography ==
=== Books ===
- Sherman, Paul W.; Alcock, John, eds. (2013). Exploring Animal Behavior: Readings from American Scientist (6th ed.). Sunderland (Mass.): Sinauer ass. ISBN 978-1-60535-195-7.
- Wolff, Jerry O.; Sherman, Paul W., eds. (2007). Rodent Societies: An Ecological and Evolutionary Perspective. Chicago, IL: University of Chicago Press.
- Sherman, Paul; Jarvis, Jennifer U.M.; Alexander, Richard D., eds. (1991). The Biology of the Naked Mole-Rat. Princeton University Press. ISBN 978-0-691-62886-8.

=== Papers ===
- Hoogland, John L.; Sherman, Paul W. (1976-01-01). "Advantages and disadvantages of bank swallow (Riparia riparia) coloniality". Ecological Monographs. 46 (1): 33–58. Bibcode:1976EcoM...46...33H. doi:10.2307/1942393. JSTOR 1942393.
- Sherman, Paul W. (1977-09-01). "Nepotism and the evolution of alarm calls". Science. 197 (4310): 1246–1253. Bibcode:1977Sci...197.1246S. doi:10.1126/science.197.4310.1246. PMID 17781971.
- Holmes, Warren G.; Sherman, Paul W. (1982-08-01). "The Ontogeny of Kin Recognition in Two Species of Ground Squirrels". American Zoologist. 22 (3): 491–517. doi:10.1093/ICB/22.3.491.
- Billing, Jennifer; Sherman, Paul W. (1999-06-01). "Antimicrobial functions of spices: why some like it hot". Quarterly Review of Biology. 73 (1): 3–49. doi:10.1086/420058. PMID 9586227.
- Flaxman, Samuel M.; Sherman, Paul W. (2000-06-01). "Morning sickness:a mechanism for protecting mother and embryo". Quarterly Review of Biology. 72 (2): 113–148. doi:10.1086/393377. PMID 10858967.
- Schlaepfer, Martin A.; Runge, Michael C.; Sherman, Paul W. (2002-10-01). "Ecological and evolutionary traps". Trends in Ecology & Evolution. 17 (10): 474–480. doi:10.1016/S0169-5347(02)02580-6.
- Sherman, Paul W.; Holland, Erica; Sherman, Janet Shellman (2008-12-01). "Allergies: their role in cancer prevention". Quarterly Review of Biology. 83 (4): 339–362. doi:10.1086/592850. PMID 19143335.
- Wilson, Christopher G.; Sherman, Paul W. (2010-07-01). "Anciently asexual bdelloid rotifers escape lethal fungal parasites by drying up and blowing away". Science. 327 (5965): 574–576. Bibcode:2010Sci...327..574W. doi:10.1126/science.1179252. PMID 20110504.
