= Psychoneuroendocrinology (journal) =

- Discipline: Psychoneuroendocrinology
- Language: English
- Edited by: Elizabeth Shirtcliff

Publication details
- History: 1976-present
- Publisher: Elsevier in affiliation with the International Society of Psychoneuroendocrinology
- Frequency: Monthly
- Impact factor: 4.693 (2021)

Standard abbreviations
- ISO 4: Psychoneuroendocrinology

Indexing
- CODEN: PSYCDE
- ISSN: 0306-4530
- OCLC no.: 644285842

Links
- Journal homepage; Online access; Online archive

Psychoneuroendocrinology is a monthly peer-reviewed scientific journal covering research in psychoneuroendocrinology published by Elsevier. It is an official journal of the International Society of Psychoneuroendocrinology and was established in 1976. The editor-in-chief is Elizabeth Shirtcliff (University of Oregon). The journal publishes papers dealing with the interrelated disciplines of psychology, neurobiology, endocrinology, immunology, neurology, and psychiatry, with an emphasis on studies integrating these disciplines in terms of either basic research or clinical implications.

The journal and society support the "Bruce McEwen Lifetime Achievement award" for contributions to the understanding of brain-body interactions and the "Dirk Hellhammer award" to distinguished young investigators in the field of psychoneuroendocrinology.

== Abstracting and indexing ==
The journal is abstracted and indexed in:

- Chemical Abstracts Service
- Current Contents/Life Sciences
- Embase
- Elsevier Biobase
- MEDLINE
- PsycINFO
- PsycLIT
- Science Citation Index Expanded
- Scopus

According to the Journal Citation Reports, the journal has a 2021 impact factor of 4.693.
