= Psychoneuroimmunology =

Area of study within psychosomatic medicine

Psychoneuroimmunology (PNI), also referred to as psychoendoneuroimmunology (PENI) or psychoneuroendocrinoimmunology (PNEI), is the study of the interaction between psychological processes and the nervous and immune systems of the human body. It is a subfield of psychosomatic medicine. PNI takes an interdisciplinary approach, incorporating psychology, neuroscience, immunology, physiology, genetics, pharmacology, molecular biology, psychiatry, behavioral medicine, infectious diseases, endocrinology, and rheumatology.

The main interests of PNI are the interactions between the nervous and immune systems and the relationships between mental processes and health. PNI studies, among other things, the physiological functioning of the neuroimmune system in health and disease; disorders of the neuroimmune system (autoimmune diseases; hypersensitivities; immune deficiency); and the physical, chemical and physiological characteristics of the components of the neuroimmune system in vitro, in situ, and in vivo.

== History ==
Mid-20th century studies of psychiatric patients reported immune alterations in psychotic individuals, including lower numbers of lymphocytes and poorer antibody response to pertussis vaccination, compared with nonpsychiatric control subjects. In 1964, George F. Solomon, from the University of California in Los Angeles, and his research team coined the term "psychoimmunology" and published a landmark paper: "Emotions, immunity, and disease: a speculative theoretical integration."

=== Origins ===
In 1975, Robert Ader and Nicholas Cohen, at the University of Rochester, advanced PNI with their demonstration of classic conditioning of immune function, and they subsequently coined the term "psychoneuroimmunology". Ader was investigating how long conditioned responses (in the sense of Pavlov's conditioning of dogs to drool when they heard a bell ring) might last in laboratory rats. To condition the rats, he used a combination of saccharin-laced water (the conditioned stimulus) and the drug Cytoxan, which unconditionally induces nausea and taste aversion and suppression of immune function. Ader was surprised to discover that after conditioning, just feeding the rats saccharin-laced water was associated with the death of some animals and he proposed that they had been immunosuppressed after receiving the conditioned stimulus. Ader (a psychologist) and Cohen (an immunologist) directly tested this hypothesis by deliberately immunizing conditioned and unconditioned animals, exposing these and other control groups to the conditioned taste stimulus, and then measuring the amount of antibody produced. The highly reproducible results revealed that conditioned rats exposed to the conditioned stimulus were indeed immunosuppressed. In other words, a signal via the nervous system (taste) was affecting immune function. This was one of the first scientific experiments that demonstrated that the nervous system can affect the immune system.

In the 1970s, Hugo Besedovsky, Adriana del Rey and Ernst Sorkin, working in Switzerland, reported multi-directional immune-neuro-endocrine interactions, since they show that not only the brain can influence immune processes but also the immune response itself can affect the brain and neuroendocrine mechanisms. They found that the immune responses to innocuous antigens triggers an increase in the activity of hypothalamic neurons and hormonal and autonomic nerve responses that are relevant for immunoregulation and are integrated at brain levels (see review). On these bases, they proposed that the immune system acts as a sensorial receptor organ that, besides its peripheral effects, can communicate to the brain and associated neuro-endocrine structures its state of activity. These investigators also identified products from immune cells, later characterized as cytokines, that mediate this immune-brain communication (more references in).

In 1981, David L. Felten, then working at the Indiana University School of Medicine, and his colleague JM Williams, discovered a network of nerves leading to blood vessels as well as cells of the immune system. The researchers also found nerves in the thymus and spleen terminating near clusters of lymphocytes, macrophages, and mast cells, all of which help control immune function. This discovery provided one of the first indications of how neuro-immune interaction occurs.

Ader, Cohen, and Felten went on to edit the groundbreaking book Psychoneuroimmunology in 1981, which laid out the underlying premise that the brain and immune system represent a single, integrated system of defense.

In 1985, research by neuropharmacologist Candace Pert, of the National Institutes of Health at Georgetown University, revealed that neuropeptide-specific receptors are present on the cell walls of both the brain and the immune system. The discovery that neuropeptides and neurotransmitters act directly upon the immune system shows their close association with emotions and suggests mechanisms through which emotions, from the limbic system, and immunology are deeply interdependent. Showing that the immune and endocrine systems are modulated not only by the brain but also by the central nervous system itself affected the understanding of emotions, as well as disease.

Contemporary advances in psychiatry, immunology, neurology, and other integrated disciplines of medicine has fostered enormous growth for PNI. The mechanisms underlying behaviorally induced alterations of immune function, and immune alterations inducing behavioral changes, are likely to have clinical and therapeutic implications that will not be fully appreciated until more is known about the extent of these interrelationships in normal and pathophysiological states.

== The immune-brain loop ==
PNI research looks for the exact mechanisms by which specific neuroimmune effects are achieved. Evidence for nervous-immunological interactions exist at multiple biological levels.

The immune system and the brain communicate through signaling pathways. The brain and the immune system are the two major adaptive systems of the body. Two major pathways are involved in this cross-talk: the Hypothalamic-pituitary-adrenal axis (HPA axis), and the sympathetic nervous system (SNS), via the sympathetic-adrenal-medullary system (SAM system). The activation of SNS during an immune response might be aimed to localize the inflammatory response.

The body's primary stress management system is the HPA axis. The HPA axis responds to physical and mental challenge to maintain homeostasis in part by controlling the body's cortisol level. Dysregulation of the HPA axis is implicated in numerous stress-related diseases, with evidence from meta-analyses indicating that different types/duration of stressors and unique personal variables can shape the HPA response.

The major hormones involved in the HPA axis are listed below, along with their functions.

- Corticotropin-releasing hormone (CRH): has been proven to aid in regulating the behavioral, autonomic, endocrine, reproductive, cardiovascular, gastrointestinal, and metabolic functions of both the central and peripheral nervous systems. CRH also exhibits immunosuppressive effects.
- Adrenocorticotropic hormone (ACTH): triggers the adrenal glands to release cortisol and sex hormones, such as androgens. ACTH also plays an indirect role in the stimulation of epinephrine and norepinephrine.
- Cortisol: typically known as the "stress hormone", regulates the body's stress response and controls the body's metabolism and has been shown to suppress inflammation, regulate blood pressure, and regulate blood sugar.
- Aldosterone (ALD): controls the levels of sodium and potassium in the blood to regulate blood pressure and blood volume. ALD also plays an indirect role in regulating the pH of the blood as well as electrolyte levels.
- Dehydroepiandrosterone (DHEA): stimulates production of other hormones, such as testosterone and estrogen. DHEA peaks in early adulthood and decreases with age.
- Antidiuretic hormone (ADH): causes the kidneys to retain more water, which decreases the amount of urine that is produced).
- Thyrotropin-releasing hormone (TRH): promotes thyrotropin, prolactin, and growth hormone release. TRH is also known to inhibit somatostatin release.
- T3 & T4: T4, commonly referred to as thyroxine, is a precursor for the primary thyroid hormone, which is T3. T4 is typically inactive, meaning it does not impact cells. However, T3 is considered active and directly impacts metabolism.

Molecules called pro-inflammatory cytokines, which include interleukin-1 (IL-1), Interleukin-2 (IL-2), interleukin-6 (IL-6), Interleukin-12 (IL-12), Interferon-gamma (IFN-Gamma) and tumor necrosis factor alpha (TNF-alpha) can affect brain growth as well as neuronal function. Circulating immune cells such as macrophages, as well as glial cells (microglia and astrocytes) secrete these molecules. Cytokine regulation of hypothalamic function is an active area of research for the treatment of anxiety-related disorders.

HPA axis activity and cytokines are intrinsically intertwined: inflammatory cytokines stimulate adrenocorticotropic hormone (ACTH) and cortisol secretion, while, in turn, glucocorticoids suppress the synthesis of pro-inflammatory cytokines. Cytokines mediate and control immune and inflammatory responses. Complex interactions exist between cytokines, inflammation and the adaptive responses in maintaining homeostasis. Like the stress response, the inflammatory reaction is crucial for survival. Systemic inflammatory reaction results in stimulation of four major programs:

- the acute-phase reaction: a natural reaction against infection or injury that typically involves fever, leukocytosis, increased vascular permeability, and increased serum levels of acute phase proteins.
- sickness behavior: a set of behavioral changes that individuals will undergo during the course of an infection, which is caused by the effects of pro-inflammatory cytokines on the brain. Examples of pro-inflammatory cytokines include IL-1 and TNF-α.
- the pain program: explains how cytokines contribute to pain. There are two classes of cytokines related to pain: pain-promoting and pain-reducing. Cytokines that are considered to serve pain-promoting functions are TNF-α, IL-1β, IL-6, and IFN-γ. Cytokines that are considered to serve pain-reducing functions are IL-10 and TGF-β.
- the stress response

These are mediated by the HPA axis and the SNS. Common human diseases such as allergy, autoimmunity, chronic infections and sepsis are characterized by a dysregulation of the pro-inflammatory versus anti-inflammatory and T helper (Th1) versus (Th2) cytokine balance. Recent studies show pro-inflammatory cytokine processes take place during depression, mania and bipolar disease, in addition to autoimmune hypersensitivity and chronic infections.

Chronic secretion of stress hormones, glucocorticoids (GCs) and catecholamines (CAs), as a result of disease, may reduce the effect of neurotransmitters, including serotonin, norepinephrine and dopamine, or other receptors in the brain, thereby leading to the dysregulation of neurohormones. Under stimulation, norepinephrine is released from the sympathetic nerve terminals in organs, and the target immune cells express adrenoreceptors. Through stimulation of these receptors, locally released norepinephrine, or circulating catecholamines such as epinephrine, affect lymphocyte traffic, circulation, and proliferation, and modulate cytokine production and the functional activity of different lymphoid cells.

Glucocorticoids also inhibit the further secretion of corticotropin-releasing hormone from the hypothalamus and ACTH from the pituitary (negative feedback). Under certain conditions stress hormones may facilitate inflammation through induction of signaling pathways and through activation of the corticotropin-releasing hormone.

These abnormalities and the failure of the adaptive systems to resolve inflammation affect the well-being of the individual, including behavioral parameters, quality of life and sleep, as well as indices of metabolic and cardiovascular health, developing into a "systemic anti-inflammatory feedback" and/or "hyperactivity" of the local pro-inflammatory factors which may contribute to the pathogenesis of disease.

This systemic or neuro-inflammation and neuroimmune activation have been shown to play a role in the etiology of a variety of neurodegenerative disorders such as Parkinson's and Alzheimer's disease, multiple sclerosis, pain, and AIDS-associated dementia. However, cytokines and chemokines also modulate central nervous system (CNS) function in the absence of overt immunological, physiological, or psychological challenges.

== Psychoneuroimmunological effects ==
There are now sufficient data to conclude that immune modulation by psychosocial stressors and/or interventions can lead to actual health changes. Recent data has proven that psychosocial interventions are associated with decreased proinflammatory cytokines and increased immune cell counts. These results were further supported when combined with cognitive behavioral therapy (CBT) treatment. Although changes related to infectious disease and wound healing have provided the strongest evidence to date, the clinical importance of immunological dysregulation is highlighted by increased risks across diverse conditions and diseases. For example, stressors can produce profound health consequences. In one epidemiological study, all-cause mortality increased in the month following a severe stressor – the death of a spouse. Theorists propose that stressful events trigger cognitive and affective responses which, in turn, induce sympathetic nervous system and endocrine changes, and these ultimately impair immune function. Potential health consequences are broad, but include rates of infection HIV progression cancer incidence and progression, and high rates of infant mortality.

One study reviewed patients with PTSD and revealed that DHEA, which is a precursor for synthesis of molecules released from the adrenal cortex in response to stress, has antiglucocorticoid properties. When under stress, blood DHEA levels rapidly increased. A higher DHEA-to-cortisol ratio is correlated with resilience while a lower DHEA-to-cortisol ratio is associated with more severe forms of PTSD.

=== Understanding stress and immune function ===
Stress is thought to affect immune function through emotional and/or behavioral manifestations such as anxiety, fear, tension, anger and sadness and physiological changes such as heart rate, blood pressure, and sweating. Researchers have suggested that these changes are beneficial if they are of limited duration, but when stress is chronic, the system is unable to maintain equilibrium or homeostasis; the body remains in a state of arousal, where digestion is slower to reactivate or does not reactivate properly, often resulting in indigestion. Furthermore, blood pressure stays at higher levels.

In one of the earlier PNI studies, which was published in 1960, subjects were led to believe that they had accidentally caused serious injury to a companion through misuse of explosives. Since then decades of research resulted in two large meta-analyses, which showed consistent immune dysregulation in healthy people who are experiencing stress.

In the first meta-analysis by Herbert and Cohen in 1993, they examined 38 studies of stressful events and immune function in healthy adults. They included studies of acute laboratory stressors (e.g. a speech task), short-term naturalistic stressors (e.g. medical examinations), and long-term naturalistic stressors (e.g. divorce, bereavement, caregiving, unemployment). They found consistent stress-related increases in numbers of total white blood cells, as well as decreases in the numbers of helper T cells, suppressor T cells, and cytotoxic T cells, B cells, and natural killer cells (NK). They also reported stress-related decreases in NK and T cell function, and T cell proliferative responses to phytohaemagglutinin [PHA] and concanavalin A [Con A]. These effects were consistent for short-term and long-term naturalistic stressors, but not laboratory stressors.

In the second meta-analysis by Zorrilla et al. in 2001, they replicated Herbert and Cohen's meta-analysis. Using the same study selection procedures, they analyzed 75 studies of stressors and human immunity. Naturalistic stressors were associated with increases in number of circulating neutrophils, decreases in number and percentages of total T cells and helper T cells, and decreases in percentages of natural killer cell (NK) cells and cytotoxic T cell lymphocytes. They also replicated Herbert and Cohen's finding of stress-related decreases in NKCC and T cell mitogen proliferation to phytohaemagglutinin (PHA) and concanavalin A (Con A).

A study done by the American Psychological Association did an experiment on rats, where they applied electrical shocks to a rat, and saw how interleukin-1 was released directly into the brain. Interleukin-1 is the same cytokine released when a macrophage chews on a bacterium, which then travels up the vagus nerve, creating a state of heightened immune activity, and behavioral changes.

More recently, there has been increasing interest in the links between interpersonal stressors and immune function. For example, marital conflict, loneliness, caring for a person with a chronic medical condition, and other forms on interpersonal stress dysregulate immune function.

=== Communication between the brain and immune system ===
- Stimulation of brain sites alters immunity (stressed animals have altered immune systems).
- Damage to brain hemispheres alters immunity (hemispheric lateralization effects).
- Immune cells produce cytokines that act on the CNS.
- Immune cells respond to signals from the CNS.

=== Communication between neuroendocrine and immune system ===
- Glucocorticoids and catecholamines influence immune cells.
- Hypothalamic Pituitary Adrenal axis releases the needed hormones to support the immune system.
- Activity of the immune system is correlated with neurochemical/neuroendocrine activity of brain cells.

=== Connections between glucocorticoids and immune system ===
- Anti-inflammatory hormones that enhance the organism's response to a stressor.
- Prevent the overreaction of the body's own defense system.
- Overactivation of glucocorticoid receptors can lead to health risks.
- Regulators of the immune system.
- Affect cell growth, proliferation and differentiation.
- Cause immunosuppression which can lead to an extended amount of time fighting off infections.
- High basal levels of cortisol are associated with a higher risk of infection.
- Suppress cell adhesion, antigen presentation, chemotaxis and cytotoxicity.
- Increase apoptosis.

=== Corticotropin-releasing hormone (CRH) ===
Release of corticotropin-releasing hormone (CRH) from the hypothalamus is influenced by stress.

- CRH is a major regulator of the HPA axis/stress axis.
- CRH Regulates secretion of adrenocorticotropic hormone (ACTH).
- CRH is widely distributed in the brain and periphery
- CRH also regulates the actions of the Autonomic nervous system ANS and immune system.

Furthermore, stressors that enhance the release of CRH suppress the function of the immune system; conversely, stressors that depress CRH release potentiate immunity.

- Central mediated since peripheral administration of CRH antagonist does not affect immunosuppression.
- HPA axis/stress axis responds consistently to stressors that are new, unpredictable and that have low-perceived control.
- As cortisol reaches an appropriate level in response to the stressor, it deregulates the activity of the hippocampus, hypothalamus, and pituitary gland which results in less production of cortisol.

=== Relationships between prefrontal cortex activation and cellular senescence ===
- Psychological stress is regulated by the prefrontal cortex (PFC)
- The PFC modulates vagal activity
- Prefrontally modulated and vagally mediated cholinergic input to the spleen reduces inflammatory responses

== Pharmaceutical advances ==
Glutamate agonists, cytokine inhibitors, vanilloid-receptor agonists, catecholamine modulators, ion-channel blockers, anticonvulsants, GABA agonists (including opioids and cannabinoids), COX inhibitors, acetylcholine modulators, melatonin analogs (such as Ramelton), adenosine receptor antagonists and several miscellaneous drugs (including biologics like Passiflora edulis) are being studied for their psychoneuroimmunological effects.

For example, SSRIs, SNRIs and tricyclic antidepressants acting on serotonin, norepinephrine, dopamine and cannabinoid receptors have been shown to be immunomodulatory and anti-inflammatory against pro-inflammatory cytokine processes, specifically on the regulation of IFN-gamma and IL-10, as well as TNF-alpha and IL-6 through a psychoneuroimmunological process. Antidepressants have also been shown to suppress TH1 upregulation.

Tricyclic and dual serotonergic-noradrenergic reuptake inhibition by SNRIs (or SSRI-NRI combinations), have also shown analgesic properties additionally. According to recent evidences antidepressants also seem to exert beneficial effects in experimental autoimmune neuritis in rats by decreasing Interferon-beta (IFN-beta) release or augmenting NK activity in depressed patients.

These studies warrant investigation of antidepressants for use in both psychiatric and non-psychiatric illness and that a psychoneuroimmunological approach may be required for optimal pharmacotherapy in many diseases. Future antidepressants may be made to specifically target the immune system by either blocking the actions of pro-inflammatory cytokines or increasing the production of anti-inflammatory cytokines.

The endocannabinoid system appears to play a significant role in the mechanism of action of clinically effective and potential antidepressants and may serve as a target for drug design and discovery. The endocannabinoid-induced modulation of stress-related behaviors appears to be mediated, at least in part, through the regulation of the serotonergic system, by which cannabinoid CB_{1} receptors modulate the excitability of dorsal raphe serotonin neurons. Data suggest that the endocannabinoid system in cortical and subcortical structures is differentially altered in an animal model of depression and that the effects of chronic, unpredictable stress (CUS) on CB_{1} receptor binding site density are attenuated by antidepressant treatment while those on endocannabinoid content are not.

The increase in amygdalar CB_{1} receptor binding following imipramine treatment is consistent with prior studies which collectively demonstrate that several treatments which are beneficial to depression, such as electroconvulsive shock and tricyclic antidepressant treatment, increase CB_{1} receptor activity in subcortical limbic structures, such as the hippocampus, amygdala and hypothalamus. And preclinical studies have demonstrated the CB_{1} receptor is required for the behavioral effects of noradrenergic based antidepressants but is dispensable for the behavioral effect of serotonergic based antidepressants.

Extrapolating from the observations that positive emotional experiences boost the immune system, Roberts speculates that intensely positive emotional experiences—sometimes brought about during mystical experiences occasioned by psychedelic medicines—may boost the immune system powerfully. Research on salivary IgA supports this hypothesis, but experimental testing has not been done.

== See also ==
=== Branches of medicine ===
- Biological psychiatry
- Psychoneuroendocrinology
- Neuroanatomy
- Neurobiology
- Neurochemistry
- Neurophysics

=== Neuroanatomy ===
- Locus ceruleus
- Pedunculopontine nucleus
- Raphe nucleus
- Reticular activating system
- Suprachiasmatic nucleus

=== Related topics ===
- Allostatic load
- Fight-or-flight response
- Healing environments
- Immuno-psychiatry
- Neural top down control of physiology
- PANDAS
- Post-traumatic stress disorder
- Psychoneuroendocrinology (journal)
- Cholinergic anti-inflammatory pathway
- Ecoimmunology
- Three Principles Psychology
