= Rank theory of depression =

Evolutionary theory of depression

Rank theory is an evolutionary theory of depression, developed by Anthony Stevens and John Price, and proposes that depression promotes the survival of genes. Depression is an adaptive response to losing status (rank) and losing confidence in the ability to regain it. The adaptive function of the depression is to change behaviour to promote survival for someone who has been defeated. According to rank theory, depression was naturally selected to allow us to accept a subordinate role. The function of this depressive adaptation is to prevent the loser from suffering further defeat in a conflict.

In the face of defeat, a behavioural process swings into action which causes the individual to cease competing and reduce their ambitions. This process is involuntary and results in the loss of energy, depressed mood, sleep disturbance, poor appetite, and loss of confidence, which are typical characteristics of depression. The outward symptoms of depression (facial expressions, constant crying, etc.) signal to others that the loser is not fit to compete, and they also discourage others from attempting to restore the loser's rank.

This acceptance of a lower rank would serve to stabilise an ancestral human community, promoting the survival of any individual (or individual's genes) in the community through affording protection from other human groups, retaining access to resources, and to mates. The adaptive function of accepting a lower rank is twofold: first, it ensures that the loser truly yields and does not attempt to make a comeback, and second, the loser reassures the winner that yielding has truly taken place, so that the conflict ends, with no further damage to the loser. Social harmony is then restored.

== Development ==
Rank theory of depression, initially known as the 'social competition hypothesis', is based on ethological theories of signalling: in order to avoid injury, animals will perform 'appeasement displays' to demonstrate their subordination and lack of desire to engage in further competition. Additionally, rank theory attempts to explain the link between low socioeconomic status and depression through a psychosocial lens.

John Price formulated rank theory after noticing that monkeys became uncommunicative following a competitive loss (e.g. relating to food, allies, or mates). He proposed that humans similarly submit in competitive situations to induce reconciliation. By submitting to their opponent, losers allow a new hierarchy to form, strengthening social cohesion. Depression is therefore a ritualistic behaviour which fulfils an adaptive function: the loser is able to escape physical injury by signalling that they are no longer a threat. This adaptive strategy has been called "Involuntary Defeat Strategy" (IDS) to clarify that losers may demonstrate submissiveness to victors using other strategies, which have not been linked to depression. Although, historically, the Involuntary Defeat Strategy may have also prevented the loss of further material resources (e.g. food, shelter), evolutionary psychologists argue that this explanation is still applicable to modern societies, where humans compete on resources such as attractiveness and competency.

== Application to symptoms ==
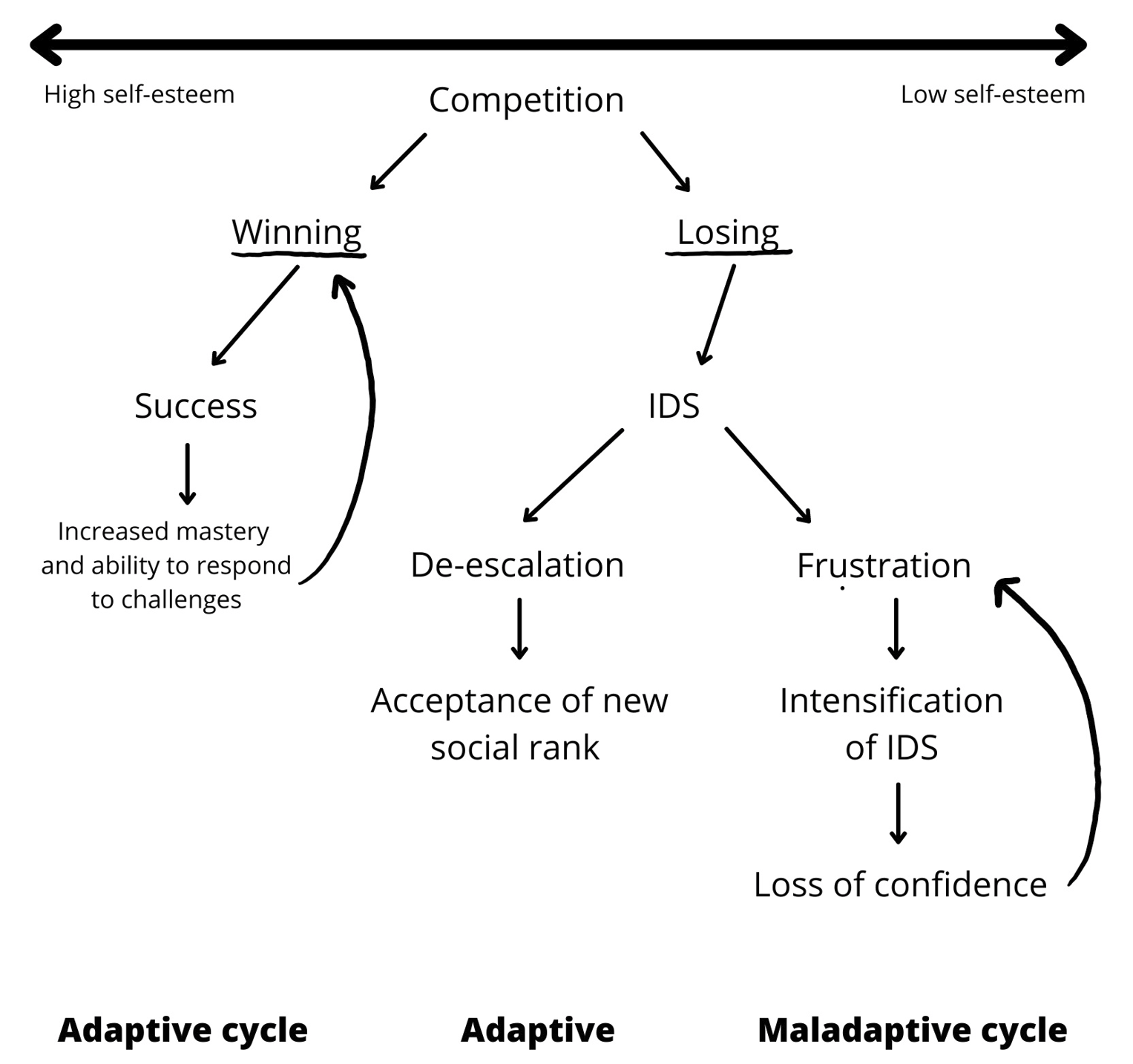
Figure 1: The adaptive and maladaptive cycles resulting from agonistic (hierarchical) encounters.

Unlike other evolutionary explanations of depression, rank theory is able to explain why depression is incapacitating: by functioning as a substitute for physical damage, incapacitation prevents the 'loser' from posing a threat to the competitor they challenged. Moreover, rank theory aligns with Beck's cognitive triad, which proposes that depressed individuals suffer cognitive distortions which result in pessimistic beliefs. Rank theory explains this pessimism by arguing that 'losers' with low expectations about their abilities are less likely to engage in competition, because they are pessimistic about their chances. The explanation also accounts for common symptoms (e.g. apathy, loss of interest, anhedonia) by arguing they evolved as a form of harm-avoidance.

Psychologists such as Paul Gilbert have sought to explain the differences between depressive states following competition and major depression. Gilbert has suggested that depression resulting from the Involuntary Defeat Strategy is a short-term condition, which becomes more serious due to external events (e.g. victor ignores the attempt at reconciliation) or internal events (e.g. excessive rumination). Rank theorists argue that depression, like vomiting, can become maladaptive when the defence mechanism, designed for the short-term, is overused (see Fig. 1).

=== Arrested flight ===
One factor which may make IDS develop into major depression is arrested flight. When individuals are unable to flee from dangerous situations, this 'entrapment' may intensify the depressive symptoms, making the condition long-term. If the 'de-escalation strategies' used by the loser are overexaggerated, this may result in symptoms such as social anxiety and excessively low self-esteem.

=== Childhood attachment ===
Another factor which may explain why certain individuals are more prone to major depression is the degree of childhood attachment security. Children with insecure attachments, for instance due to being raised in an abusive household, may have experienced a more frequent triggering of the Involuntary Defence Strategy. This results in an overly sensitive IDS, which requires significantly less stimulation to engage in submissive behaviours. Unlike securely attached children, whose IDS functions adaptively by allowing them to accept defeat, insecurely attached children will back down too early, lose confidence in their ability to win competitions, and therefore may be more prone to developing long-term depression.

=== Prevalence in adolescence ===
Rank theorists has also suggested an explanation to account for high depression rates in teenagers. As competition for social approval is particularly salient in teenage peer relations, adolescents may emphasise social comparison more. Rank theorists propose that children with insecure attachments enter the highly socially competitive dynamic of adolescence feeling more submissive or craving a dominant role. Due to fixating on social rank, these adolescents are more sensitive to social competition and are more likely to overuse the IDS, resulting in a higher likelihood of depression.

== Therapeutic implications ==
Although not intended to become a new 'school of therapy', rank theorists have proposed changes to existing therapeutic interventions for depression such as cognitive behavioral therapy and psychodynamic treatment:

- Status-changing: Treating depressed individuals as high-status may reduce their self-perception of inferiority
- Preventing rumination: Assisting clients in recognising their virtues by magnifying their achievements can reduce the likelihood of IDS developing into maladaptive cycles
- Assertiveness: Teaching individuals to stand up for themselves may prevent accumulations of rage and encourage coping with anger more healthily
- Strategy-switching: Showing clients that they submit too quickly or not quickly enough (because they don't recognise the vulnerability of their position) may help individuals avoid misusing the IDS
- Goal-setting: setting small, achievable goals to build up the client's confidence may prevent a loss of confidence and help clients avoid reinforcing maladaptive cycles

== Criticism ==
The largest limitation of evolutionary explanations of depression, which include rank theory, is the lack of falsifiability. While these theories provide "reasonably parsimonious" explanations, they are not grounded in empirical research, which severely affects their real-world application.

=== Anger ===
As rank theory suggests that depression functions to inhibit aggression and stimulate submissive behaviours, one criticism is rank theory's inability to account for higher levels of anger found in depressed individuals than in controls. However, rank theorists have weakened this argument by arguing that hostility in depressed individuals is just redirected towards 'lower-ranking' individuals in the social hierarchy (e.g. children) or objects (e.g. furniture).

=== Power ===
Another criticism of rank theory is that it may not account for depressed individuals who are socially powerful and exert manipulation over others, despite supposedly engaging in submissive behaviour. To combat this criticism, rank theorists have suggested that depressed individuals only use manipulation on their supporters in order to switch support from being agonistic (i.e. intended to help the individual win in a competition by boasting) to being nurturing (i.e. accepting the individual has lost and also backing down).

=== Mood ===
As individuals at the top of hierarchies may have depression, and not all those on the low end of the hierarchy exhibit depressive symptoms, critics of rank theory have also argued that the mismatch between rank and mood weakens this explanation for depression. However, this argument may over-simplify rank theory, as it does not take into account the social comparison element of rank theory, which suggests that dissatisfaction with one's rank may be due to comparison with peers who have achieved higher social ranks. Moreover, rank theorists have argued that the stress of a low rank may also depend on factors such as lower-rank individuals attempting to usurp you and higher-rank individuals bullying you.
