= Deployment cost–benefit selection in physiology =

Physiological process

Deployment cost–benefit selection in physiology concerns the costs and benefits of physiological process that can be deployed and selected in regard to whether they will increase or not an animal’s survival and biological fitness. Variably deployable physiological processes relate mostly to processes that defend or clear infections as these are optional while also having high costs and circumstance linked benefits. They include immune system responses, fever, antioxidants and the plasma level of iron. Notable determining factors are life history stage, and resource availability.

== Immunity ==
Activating the immune system has the present and future benefit of clearing infections, but it is also both expensive in regard to present high metabolic energy consumption, and in the risk of resulting in a future immune related disorder. Therefore, an adaptive advantage exists if an animal can control its deployment in regard to actuary-like evaluations of future benefits and costs as to its biological fitness. In many circumstances, such trade-off calculations explain why immune responses are suppressed and infections are tolerated. Circumstances where immunity is not activated due to lack of an actuarial benefit include:

- Malnutrition
- Old age
- Hibernation
- Parasitism (low or high risk)
- Sexually transmitted diseases (low or high risk)
- Light patterns associated with winter (probable resource shortage)

== Fever ==
Cost benefit trade-off actuary issues apply to the antibacterial and antiviral effects of fever (increased body temperature). Fever has the future benefit of clearing infections since it reduces the replication of bacteria and viruses. But it also has great present metabolic (BMR) cost, and the risk of hyperpyrexia. Where it is achieved internally, each degree raise in blood temperature, raises BMR by 10–15%. 90% of the total cost of fighting pneumonia, goes, for example, on energy devoted to raising body temperature. During sepsis, the resulting fever can raise BMR by 55%—and cause a 15% to 30% loss of body mass. Circumstances in which fever deployment is not selected or is reduced include:

- Aged individuals—the burden of tolerating infection will exist for a short time which reduces the actuarial future benefits of clearing an infection compared to the costs of its removal. This change favors reduced or no deployment of fever.
- When internal resources are limited (such as in winter), and the ability to afford high expenditure on increased metabolism is reduced. This increases the risks of activating fever relative to its potential benefit, and animals are less likely to use fever to fight infections.
- Late Pregnancy

== Antioxidants ==
Antioxidants such as carotenoids, vitamin C, Vitamin E, and enzymes such as superoxide dismutase (SOD) and glutathione peroxidase (GPx) can protect against reactive oxygen species that damage DNA, proteins and lipids, and result in cell senescence and death. A cost exists in creating or obtaining these antioxidants. This creates a conflict between the biological fitness benefits of future survival compared with the use of these antioxidants to advantage present reproductive success. In some birds, antioxidants are diverted from maintaining the body to reproduction for this reason with the result that they have accelerated senescence Related to this, birds can show their biological capacity to afford the cost of diverting antioxidants (such as carotenoids) in the form of pigments into plumage as a costly signal.

== Hypoferremia ==
Iron is vital to biological processes, not only of a host, but also to bacteria infecting the host. A biological fitness advantage can exist for hosts to reduce the availability of iron within itself to such bacteria (hypoferremia), even though this happens at a cost of the host impairing itself with anemia. The potential benefits of such self impairment is illustrated by the paradoxical effect that providing iron supplements to those with iron deficiency (which interferes with its antibacterial action) can result in an individual being cured of anemia but having increased bacterial illness.

== See also ==
- Adaptation
- Cost–benefit analysis
- Evolutionary medicine
