= Sickness behavior =

Aspect of psychology

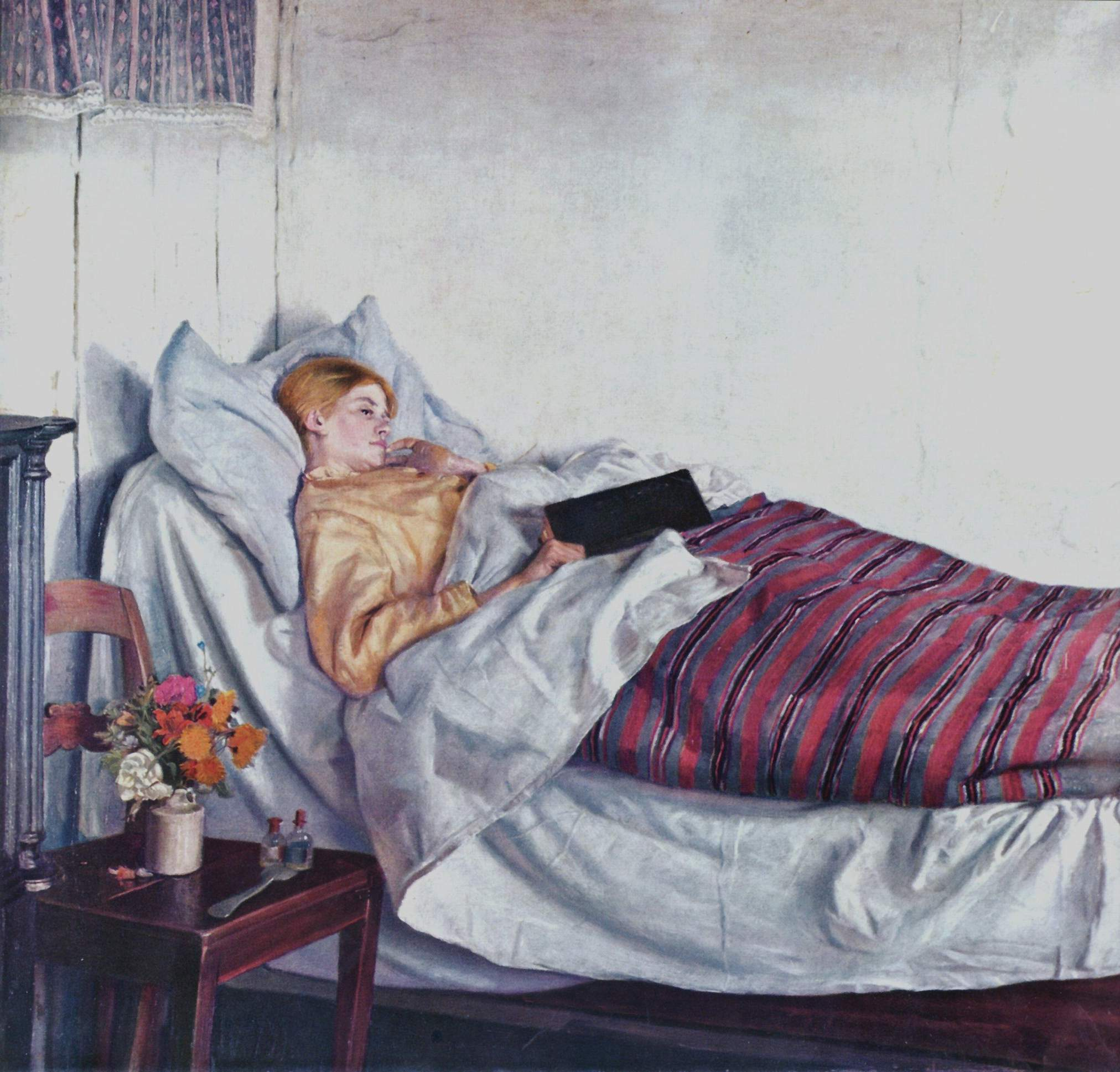
Ancher, Michael, "The Sick Girl", 1882, Statens Museum for Kunst

Sickness behavior is a coordinated set of adaptive behavioral changes that develop in ill individuals during the course of an infection. They usually, but not always, accompany fever and aid survival. Such illness responses include lethargy, depression, anxiety, malaise, loss of appetite, sleepiness, hyperalgesia, reduction in grooming and failure to concentrate. Sickness behavior is a motivational state that reorganizes the organism's priorities to cope with infectious pathogens. It has been suggested as relevant to understanding depression, and some aspects of the suffering that occurs in cancer.

== History ==
Sick animals have long been recognized by farmers as having different behavior. Initially, it was thought that this was due to physical weakness that resulted from diverting energy to the body processes needed to fight infection. However, in the 1960s, it was shown that animals produced a blood-borne factor X that acted on the brain to induce sickness behavior. In 1987, Benjamin L. Hart brought together a variety of research findings that argued for them being survival adaptations that, if prevented, would disadvantage an animal's ability to fight infection. In the 1980s, the blood-borne factor was shown to be proinflammatory cytokines produced by activated leukocytes in the immune system in response to lipopolysaccharides (a cell wall component of Gram-negative bacteria). These cytokines act by various humoral and nerve routes upon the hypothalamus and other areas of the brain. Further research showed that the brain can also learn to control the various components of sickness behavior independently of immune activation.

In 2015, Shakhar and Shakhar suggested instead that sickness behavior developed primarily because it protected the kin of infected animals from transmissible diseases. According to this theory, termed the Eyam hypothesis, after the English parish of Eyam, sickness behavior protects the social group of infected individuals by limiting their direct contacts, preventing them from contaminating the environment, and broadcasting their health status. Kin selection would help promote such behaviors through evolution. In a highly prosocial species like humans, however, sickness behavior may act as a signal to motivate others to help and care for the sick individual.

== Advantages ==
=== General advantage ===
Sickness behavior, in its different aspects, causes an animal to limit its movement; the metabolic energy not expended in activity is diverted to fever responses, which involve raising body temperature. This also limits an animal's exposure to predators while it is cognitively and physically impaired.

=== Specific advantages ===
The individual components of sickness behavior have specific individual advantages. Anorexia limits food ingestion and therefore reduces the availability of iron in the gut (and from gut absorption). Iron may aid bacterial reproduction, so its reduction is useful during sickness. Plasma concentrations of iron are lowered for this anti-bacterial reason in fever. Lowered threshold for pain ensures that an animal is attentive that it does not place pressure on injured and inflamed tissues that might disrupt their healing. Reduced grooming is adaptive since it reduces water loss.

=== Inclusive fitness advantages ===
According to the Eyam hypothesis, sickness behavior, by promoting immobility and social disinterest, limits the direct contacts of individuals with their relatives. Reducing eating and drinking limits diarrhea and defecation, reducing environmental contamination. By reducing self-grooming and altering stance, gait, and vocalizations, it also signals poor health to kin. All in all, sickness behavior reduces the rate of further infection, a trait that is likely propagated by kin selection.

=== Social advantage ===
Humans helped each other in case of sickness or injury throughout their hunter-gatherer past and afterwards. Convincing others of the sick individual's severe need for relief, assistance, and care increased the likelihood of survival. High direct costs, such as energy expended on fever and potential harm from high body temperatures, and high opportunity costs, as caused by inactivity, social disinterest, and lack of appetite, make sickness behavior a highly costly and therefore credible signal of need.

== Immune control ==
Lipopolysaccharides trigger the immune system to produce proinflammatory cytokines IL-1, IL-6, and tumor necrosis factor (TNF). These peripherally released cytokines act on the brain via a fast transmission pathway involving primary input through the vagus nerves, and a slow transmission pathway involving cytokines originating from the choroid plexus and circumventricular organs and diffusing into the brain parenchyma by volume transmission. Peripheral cytokines are capable of entering the brain directly but are large lipophilic polypeptide proteins that generally do not easily passively diffuse across the blood-brain barrier. They may also induce the expression of other cytokines in the brain that cause sickness behavior. Acute psychosocial stress enhances the ability of an immune response to trigger both inflammation and behavioral sickness.

== Behavioral conditioning ==
The components of sickness behavior can be learned by conditional association. For example, if a saccharin solution is given with a chemical that triggers a particular aspect of sickness behavior, on later occasions the saccharin solution will trigger it by itself.

== Medical conditions ==
=== Depression ===
It has been proposed that major depressive disorder is nearly identical with sickness behavior, raising the possibility that it is a maladaptive manifestation of sickness behavior due to abnormalities in circulating cytokines. Moreover, chronic, but not acute, treatment with antidepressant drugs was found to attenuate sickness behavior symptoms in rodents. High rates of depression have been observed in patients treated with cytokines like interferon-α and serve experimental evidence of immunologically-induced depression in humans. The mood effects caused by interleukin-6 following an immune response have been linked to increased activity within the subgenual anterior cingulate cortex, an area involved in the etiology of depression. Inflammation-associated mood change can also produce a reduction in the functional connectivity of this part of the brain to the amygdala, medial prefrontal cortex, nucleus accumbens, and superior temporal sulcus.

=== Cancer side effect ===
In cancer, both the disease and chemotherapy can trigger proinflammatory cytokine release, leading to sickness behavior as a side effect.

== See also ==
- Evolutionary medicine
- Proinflammatory cytokines
- Psychoneuroimmunology
