= Neural top–down control of physiology =

Systemic Brain Function of Human Physiology

Neural top–down control of physiology concerns the direct regulation by the brain of physiological functions (in addition to smooth muscle and glandular ones). Cellular functions include the immune system’s production of T-lymphocytes and antibodies, and nonimmune related homeostatic functions such as liver gluconeogenesis, sodium reabsorption, osmoregulation, and brown adipose tissue nonshivering thermogenesis. This regulation occurs through the sympathetic and parasympathetic system (the autonomic nervous system), and their direct innervation of body organs and tissues that starts in the brainstem. There is also a noninnervation hormonal control through the hypothalamus and pituitary (HPA). These lower brain areas are under control of cerebral cortex ones. Such cortical regulation differs between its left and right sides. Pavlovian conditioning shows that brain control over basic cell level physiological function can be learned.

== Higher brain ==
=== Cerebral cortex ===
Sympathetic and parasympathetic nervous systems and the hypothalamus are regulated by the higher brain. Through them, the higher cerebral cortex areas can control the immune system, and the body’s homeostatic and stress physiology. Areas doing this include the insular cortex, the orbital, and the medial prefrontal cortices. These cerebral areas also control smooth muscle and glandular physiological processes through the sympathetic and parasympathetic nervous system including blood circulation, urogenital, gastrointestinal functions, pancreatic gut secretions, respiration, coughing, vomiting, piloerection, pupil dilation, lacrimation and salivation.

=== Lateralization ===
The sympathetic nervous system is predominantly controlled by the right side of the brain (focused upon the insular cortex), while the left side predominantly controls the parasympathetic nervous system. The cerebral cortex in rodents shows lateral specialization in its regulation of immunity with immunosuppression being controlled by the right hemisphere, and immunopotention by the left one. Humans show similar lateral specialized control of the immune system from the evidence of strokes, surgery to control epilepsy, and the application of TMS.

== Brainstem ==
The higher brain top down control of physiology is mediated by the sympathetic and parasympathetic nervous systems in the brainstem, and the hypothalamus. The sympathetic nervous system arises in brainstem nuclei that project down into intermediolateral columns of thoracolumbar spinal cord neurons in spinal segments T1–L2. The parasympathetic nervous system in the motor nuclei of cranial nerves III, VII, IX, (control over the pupil and salivary glands) and X (vagus –many functions including immunity) and sacral spinal segments (gastrointestinal and urogenital systems). Another control occurs through top down control by the medial areas of the prefrontal cortex. upon the hypothalamus which has a nonnerve control of the body through hormonal secretions of the pituitary.

=== Immunity ===
The brain controls immunity both indirectly through HPA glucocorticoid secretions from the pituitary, and by various direct innervations.

- Antibodies. There is sympathetic innervation of the thymus gland. Sympathetic control exists over antibody production, and the modulation of cytokine concentrations.
- Cellular immunity. An intact sympathetic nervous system is required to maintain full cellular immunoregulation as denervated mice do not produce and activate, for example, splenic suppressor T cells, or thymic NKT cells.
- Organ inflammation. Sympathetic innervation of various organs contacts macrophages and dendritic cells and can increase local inflammation including the kidney gut, the skin, and the synovial joints
- Antiinflammation. The vagus nerve carries a parasympathetic cholinergic antiinflammatory pathway that reduces proinflammatory cytokines such as TNF by spleen macrophages in the red pulp and the marginal zone and so the activation of inflammation. This control is in part controlled by direct innervation of body organs such as the spleen. However, the existence of the parasympathetic antiinflammatory nerve pathway is controversial with one reviewer stating: “there is no evidence for an anti-inflammatory role of the efferent vagus nerve that is independent of the sympathetic nervous system.”

=== Metabolism ===
The liver receives both sympathetic and parasympathetic nervous system innervation.

- Plasma glucose levels. A vagus brain-liver axis exists that detects lipids produced by the gut and acts to regulate glucose homeostasis.
- Glycogenesis. Vagal activation also controls glycogen synthesis in the liver.
- lipogenesis. Vagal activation also controls the generation of lipids in brown adipose tissue.
- Insulin. Vagal innervation of the pancreas controls the release of insulin release from its beta cells (and this is inhibited by norepinephrine released under sympathetic control from the splanchnic nerve).
- Thyroid hormones can control glucose production via the hypothalamus and its sympathetic and parasympathetic innervation of the liver.

=== Other ===
- Thermogenesis – this is controlled by the sympathetic nervous system starting in the dorsolateral preoptic area of the anterior hypothalamus via projections from the rostral raphe pallidus to the spinal intermediolateral nucleus nonshivering thermogenesis by brown adipose tissue.
- Stress – norepinephrine and epinephrine, the stress hormones, are released from nerve terminals in the adrenal medulla in the kidney innervated from the sympathetic nervous system’s splanchnic nerve.
- Kidney function – the sympathetic nervous system projects to the kidney and controls glomerular filtration rate and so fluid balance, sodium reabsorption, and osmoregulation.

== Conditioning ==
The brains of animals can anticipatorily learn to control cell level physiology such as immunity through Pavlovian conditioning. In this conditioning, a neutral stimulus saccharin is paired in a drink with an agent, cyclophosphamide, that produces an unconditioned response (immunosuppression). After learning this pairing, the taste of saccharin by itself through neural top down control created immunosuppression, as a new conditioned response. This work was originally done on rats, however, the same conditioning can also occur in humans. The conditioned response happens in the brain with the ventromedial nucleus of the hypothalamus providing the output pathway to the immune system, the amygdala, the input of visceral information, and the insular cortex acquires and creates the conditioned response. The production of different components of the immune system can be controlled as conditioned responses:

- Antibodies
- IL-2
- B, CD8+ T cells and CD4+ naive and memory T cells, and granulocytes. Such conditioning in rats can last a year.

Nonimmune functions can also be conditioned:

- Serum iron levels
- The level of oxidative DNA damage
- Insulin secretion
- Blood glucose levels

== See also ==
- Autonomic nervous system – Division of the nervous system supplying internal organs, smooth muscle and glands
- Homeostasis – State of steady internal conditions maintained by living things
- Homeostatic emotion – Feelings, like thirst and well-being, that tell us about the state of the body
- Neuroendocrinology – Branch of biology studying interactions between the nervous and endocrine systems
- Neurogastroenterology – Vital part of the nervous system controlling the gastrointestinal tract
- Neuroimmunology – Study of relationships between nervous and immune systems
- Parasympathetic nervous system – Division of the autonomic nervous system
- Peripheral nervous system – Part of the nervous system excluding the brain and spinal cord
- Psychoneuroimmunology – Area of study within psychosomatic medicine
- Sympathetic nervous system – Part of the autonomic nervous system which stimulates fight-or-flight responses
- Vis medicatrix naturae – Latin phrase affirming the body's self-healing nature
