= Evolutionary approaches to depression =

Evolutionary approaches to depression are attempts by evolutionary psychologists and evolutionary psychiatrists to use the theory of evolution to further understand mood disorders. Depression is generally thought of as dysfunction or a mental disorder, but its prevalence does not increase with age the way dementia and other organic dysfunction commonly does. Some researchers have surmised that the disorder may have evolutionary roots, in the same way that others suggest evolutionary contributions to schizophrenia, sickle cell anemia, psychopathy and other disorders. The proposed explanations for the evolution of depression remain controversial.

== Background ==
Depression is a mental disorder characterized by pervasive low mood, diminished motivation, and loss of pleasure from normally enjoyable activities. It is a risk factor for disability and suicide, and contributes significantly to disease burden worldwide. Depression is hence thought to be a pathological state of one's brain.

In most cases, rates of organ dysfunction increase with age, with low rates in adolescents and young adults, and the highest rates in the elderly. These patterns are consistent with evolutionary theories of aging, which posit that selection against dysfunctional traits decreases with age (because there is a decreasing probability of surviving to later ages). In contrast to these patterns, prevalence of clinical depression is high across all age categories. In one 1993 study of the US population, the 12 month prevalence of major depressive episodes was highest in the youngest age category (15- to 24-year-olds), making it an outlier when compared to the prevalence of other mental disorders such as intellectual disability, autism, and schizophrenia, where all of the latter have prevalence rates about one tenth that of depression, or less. As of 2017, depression is the second most common mental disorder behind anxiety.

The common occurrence and persistence of a trait like clinical depression with such negative effects early in life is difficult to explain. (Rates of infectious disease are high in young people, of course, but clinical depression is not thought to be caused by an infection.) Evolutionary psychology and evolutionary psychiatry, and their application in evolutionary medicine suggest how behaviour and mental states, including seemingly harmful states such as depression, may have been beneficial adaptations of human ancestors which improved the fitness of individuals or their relatives. For example, Shenk (2005) suggests that Abraham Lincoln's lifelong depression was a source of insight and strength. Some even suggest that "we aren't designed to have happiness as our natural default" and so a state of depression is the evolutionary norm.

The following hypotheses attempt to identify a benefit of depression that outweighs its obvious costs.

Such hypotheses are not necessarily incompatible with one another and may explain different aspects, causes, and symptoms of depression.

== Psychic pain hypothesis ==
One reason depression is thought to be a pathology is that it causes so much psychic pain and distress. However, physical pain is also very distressful, yet it has an evolved function: to inform the organism that it is being damaged, to motivate it to withdraw from the source of damage, and to learn to avoid such damage-causing circumstances in the future. Sadness is also distressing, yet is widely believed to be an evolved adaptation. In fact, perhaps the most influential evolutionary view is that most cases of depression are simply particularly intense cases of sadness in response to adversity, such as the loss of a loved one.

According to the psychic pain hypothesis, depression is analogous to physical pain in that it informs them that current circumstances, such as the loss of a friend, are imposing a threat to biological fitness. It motivates them to cease activities that led to the costly situation, if possible, and it causes him or her to learn to avoid similar circumstances in the future. Proponents of this view tend to focus on low mood, and regard clinical depression as a dysfunctional extreme of low mood—and not as a unique set of characteristics that are physiologically distanced from regular depressed mood.

Alongside the absence of pleasure, other noticeable changes include psychomotor retardation, disrupted patterns of sleeping and feeding, a loss of sex drive and motivation—which are all also characteristics of the body's reaction to actual physical pain. In depressed people there is an increased activity in the regions of the cortex involved with the perception of pain, such as the anterior cingulate cortex and the left prefrontal cortex. This activity allows the cortex to manifest an abstract negative thought as a true physical stressor to the rest of the brain.

== Behavioral shutdown model ==
The behavioral shutdown model states that if an organism faces more risk or expenditure than reward from activities, the best evolutionary strategy may be to withdraw from them. This model proposes that emotional pain, like physical pain, serves a useful adaptive purpose. Negative emotions like disappointment, sadness, grief, fear, anxiety, anger, and guilt are described as "evolved strategies that allow for the identification and avoidance of specific problems, especially in the social domain." Depression is characteristically associated with anhedonia and lack of energy, and those experiencing it are risk-aversive and perceive more negative and pessimistic outcomes because they are focused on preventing further loss. Although the model views depression as an adaptive response, it does not suggest that it is beneficial by the standards of current society; but it does suggest that many approaches to depression treat symptoms rather than causes, and underlying social problems need to be addressed.

A related phenomenon to the behavioral shutdown model is learned helplessness. In animal subjects, a loss of control or predictability in the subject's experiences results in a condition similar to clinical depression in humans. That is to say, if uncontrollable and unstoppable stressors are repeated for long enough, a rat subject will adopt a learned helplessness, which shares a number of behavioral and psychological features with human depression. The subject will not attempt to cope with problems, even when placed in a stressor-free novel environment. Should their rare attempts at coping prove successful in a new environment, a long lasting cognitive block prevents them from perceiving their action as useful and their coping strategy does not last long. From an evolutionary perspective, learned helplessness also allows a conservation of energy for an extended period of time should people find themselves in a predicament that is outside of their control, such as an illness or a dry season. However, for today's humans whose depression resembles learned helplessness, this phenomenon usually manifests as a loss of motivation and the distortion of one uncontrollable aspect of a person's life being viewed as representative of all aspects of their life – suggesting a mismatch between ultimate cause and modern manifestation.

== Analytical rumination hypothesis ==
This hypothesis suggests that depression is an adaptation that causes the affected individual to concentrate his or her attention and focus on a complex problem in order to analyze and solve it.

One way depression increases the individual's focus on a problem is by inducing rumination. Depression activates the left ventrolateral prefrontal cortex, which increases attention control and maintains problem-related information in an "active, accessible state" referred to as "working memory", or WM. As a result, depressed individuals have been shown to ruminate, reflecting on the reasons for their current problems. Feelings of regret associated with depression also cause individuals to reflect and analyze past events in order to determine why they happened and how they could have been prevented. The rumination hypothesis has come under criticism. Evolutionary fitness is increased by ruminating before rather than after bad outcomes. A situation that resulted in a child being in danger but unharmed should lead the parent to ruminate on how to avoid the dangerous situation in the future. Waiting until the child dies and then ruminating in a state of depression is too late.

Some cognitive psychologists argue that ruminative tendency itself increases the likelihood of the onset of depression.

Another way depression increases an individual's ability to concentrate on a problem is by reducing distraction from the problem. For example, anhedonia, which is often associated with depression, decreases an individual's desire to participate in activities that provide short-term rewards, and instead, allows the individual to concentrate on long-term goals. In addition, "psychomotoric changes", such as solitariness, decreased appetite, and insomnia also reduce distractions. For instance, insomnia enables conscious analysis of the problem to be maintained by preventing sleep from disrupting such processes. Likewise, solitariness, lack of physical activity, and lack of appetite all eliminate sources of distraction, such as social interactions, navigation through the environment, and "oral activity", which disrupt stimuli from being processed.

== Possibilities of depression as a dysregulated adaptation ==
Depression, especially in the modern context, may not necessarily be adaptive. The ability to feel pain and experience depression, are adaptive defense mechanisms, but when they are "too easily triggered, too intense, or long lasting", they can become "dysregulated". In such a case, defense mechanisms, too, can become diseases, such as "chronic pain or dehydration from diarrhea". Depression, which may be a similar kind of defense mechanism, may have become dysregulated as well.

Thus, unlike other evolutionary theories this one sees depression as a maladaptive extreme of something that is beneficial in smaller amounts. In particular, one theory focuses on the personality trait neuroticism. Low amounts of neuroticism may increase a person's fitness through various processes, but too much may reduce fitness by, for example, recurring depressions. Thus, evolution will select for an optimal amount and most people will have neuroticism near this amount. However, genetic variation continually occurs, and some people will have high neuroticism which increases the risk of depressions.

== Rank theory ==
Rank theory is the hypothesis that, if an individual is involved in a lengthy fight for dominance in a social group and is clearly losing, then depression causes the individual to back down and accept the submissive role. In doing so, the individual is protected from unnecessary harm. In this way, depression helps maintain a social hierarchy. This theory is a special case of a more general theory derived from the psychic pain hypothesis: that the cognitive response that produces modern-day depression evolved as a mechanism that allows people to assess whether they are in pursuit of an unreachable goal, and if they are, to motivate them to desist.

== Social risk hypothesis ==
This hypothesis is similar to the social rank hypothesis but focuses more on the importance of avoiding exclusion from social groups, rather than direct dominance contests. The fitness benefits of forming cooperative bonds with others have long been recognised—during the Pleistocene period, for instance, social ties were vital for food foraging and finding protection from predators.

As such, depression is seen to represent an adaptive, risk-averse response to the threat of exclusion from social relationships that would have had a critical impact on the survival and reproductive success of our ancestors. Multiple lines of evidence on the mechanisms and phenomenology of depression suggest that mild to moderate (or "normative") depressed states preserve an individual's inclusion in key social contexts via three intersecting features: a cognitive sensitivity to social risks and situations (e.g., "depressive realism"); it inhibits confident and competitive behaviours that are likely to put the individual at further risk of conflict or exclusion (as indicated by symptoms such as low self-esteem and social withdrawal); and it results in signalling behaviours directed toward significant others to elicit more of their support (e.g., the so-called "cry for help"). According to this view, the severe cases of depression captured by clinical diagnoses reflect the maladaptive, dysregulation of this mechanism, which may partly be due to the uncertainty and competitiveness of the modern, globalised world.

== Honest signaling theory ==
Another reason depression is thought to be a pathology is that key symptoms, such as loss of interest in virtually all activities, are extremely costly to them. Biologists and economists have proposed, however, that signals with inherent costs can credibly signal information when there are conflicts of interest. In the wake of a serious negative life event, such as those that have been implicated in depression (e.g., death, divorce), "cheap" signals of need, such as crying, might not be believed when social partners have conflicts of interest. The symptoms of major depression, such as loss of interest in virtually all activities and suicidality, are inherently costly, but, as costly signaling theory requires, the costs differ for individuals in different states. For individuals who are not genuinely in need, the fitness cost of major depression is very high because it threatens the flow of fitness benefits. For individuals who are in genuine need, however, the fitness cost of major depression is low, because the individual is not generating many fitness benefits. Thus, only an individual in genuine need can afford to have major depression. Major depression therefore serves as an honest, or credible, signal of need.

For example, individuals suffering a severe loss such as the death of a spouse are often in need of help and assistance from others. Such individuals who have few conflicts with their social partners are predicted to experience grief—a means, in part, to signal need to others. Such individuals who have many conflicts with their social partners, in contrast, are predicted to experience depression—a means, in part, to credibly signal need to others who might be skeptical that the need is genuine.

== Bargaining theory ==
Depression is not only costly to the affected person, it also imposes a significant burden on family, friends, and society at large—yet another reason it is thought to be pathological. Yet if people with depression have real but unmet needs, they might have to provide an incentive to others to address those needs.

The bargaining theory of depression is similar to the honest signaling, niche change, and social navigation theories of depression described below. It draws on theories of labor strikes developed by economists to basically add one additional element to honest signaling theory: The fitness of social partners is generally correlated. When a wife has depression and reduces her investment in offspring, for example, the husband's fitness is also put at risk. Thus, not only do the symptoms of major depression serve as costly and therefore honest signals of need, they also compel reluctant social partners to respond to that need in order to prevent their own fitness from being reduced. This explanation for depression has been challenged. Depression decreases the joint product of the family or group as the husband or helper only partially compensates for the loss of productivity by the depressed person. Instead of being depressed the person could break their own leg and gain help from the social group, but this obviously is a counterproductive strategy. And the lack of a sex drive certainly does not improve marital relations or fitness.

== Social navigation or niche change theory ==
The social navigation or niche change hypothesis proposes that depression is a social navigation adaptation of last resort, designed especially to help individuals overcome costly, complex contractual constraints on their social niche. The hypothesis combines the analytical rumination and bargaining hypotheses and suggests that depression, operationally defined as a combination of prolonged anhedonia and psychomotor retardation or agitation, provides a focused sober perspective on socially imposed constraints hindering a person's pursuit of major fitness enhancing projects. Simultaneously, publicly displayed symptoms, which reduce the depressive's ability to conduct basic life activities, serve as a social signal of need; the signal's costliness for the depressive certifies its honesty. Finally, for social partners who find it uneconomical to respond helpfully to an honest signal of need, the same depressive symptoms also have the potential to extort relevant concessions and compromises. Depression's extortionary power comes from the fact that it slows the flow of just those goods and services such partners have come to expect from the depressive under status quo socioeconomic arrangements.

Thus depression may be a social adaptation especially useful in motivating a variety of social partners, all at once, to help the depressive initiate major fitness-enhancing changes in their socioeconomic life. There are diverse circumstances under which this may become necessary in human social life, ranging from loss of rank or a key social ally which makes the current social niche uneconomic to having a set of creative new ideas about how to make a livelihood which begs for a new niche. The social navigation hypothesis emphasizes that an individual can become tightly ensnared in an overly restrictive matrix of social exchange contracts, and that this situation sometimes necessitates a radical contractual upheaval that is beyond conventional methods of negotiation. Regarding the treatment of depression, this hypothesis calls into question any assumptions by the clinician that the typical cause of depression is related to maladaptive perverted thinking processes or other purely endogenous sources. The social navigation hypothesis calls instead for analysis of the depressive's talents and dreams, identification of relevant social constraints (especially those with a relatively diffuse non-point source within the social network of the depressive), and practical social problem-solving therapy designed to relax those constraints enough to allow the depressive to move forward with their life under an improved set of social contracts. This theory has been the subject of criticism.

== Depression as an incentive device ==
This approach argues that being in a depressed state is not adaptive (indeed quite the opposite), but the threat of depression for bad outcomes and the promise of pleasure for good outcomes are adaptive because they motivate the individual toward undertaking effort that increase fitness. The reason for not relying on pleasure alone as an incentive device is because happiness is costly in terms of fitness as the individual becomes less cautious. This is most readily seen when an individual is manic and undertakes very risky behavior. The physiological manifestation of the incentives are most noticeable when an individual is bipolar with bouts of extreme elation and extreme depression as anxiety which is about the (possibly immediate) future is highly correlated with being bipolar. As noted earlier, bipolar disorder and clinical depression, as opposed to event depression, are viewed as dysregulation just as persistently high (or low) blood pressure are viewed as dysregulation even though at times high or low blood pressure is fitness enhancing.

== Prevention of infection ==
It has been hypothesized that depression is an evolutionary adaptation because it helps prevent infection in both the affected individual and their kin.

First, the associated symptoms of depression, such as inactivity and lethargy, encourage the affected individual to rest. Energy conserved through such methods is highly crucial, as immune activation against infections is relatively costly; there must be, for instance, a 10% increase in metabolic activity for even a 1°C change in body temperature. Therefore, depression allows one to conserve and allocate energy to the immune system more efficiently.

Depression further prevents infection by discouraging social interactions and activities that may result in exchange of infections. For example, the loss of interest discourages one from engaging in sexual activity, which, in turn, prevents the exchange of sexually transmitted diseases. Similarly, depressed mothers may interact less with their children, reducing the probability of the mother infecting her kin. Lastly, the lack of appetite associated with depression may also reduce exposure to food-borne parasites.

However, it should also be noted that chronic illness itself may be involved in causing depression. In animal models, the prolonged overreaction of the immune system, in response to the strain of chronic disease, results in an increased production of cytokines (a diverse group of hormonal regulators and signaling molecules). Cytokines interact with neurotransmitter systems—mainly norepinephrine, dopamine, and serotonin, and induce depressive characteristics. The onset of depression may help an individual recover from their illness by allowing them a more reserved, safe and energetically efficient lifestyle. The overproduction of these cytokines, beyond optimal levels due to the repeated demands of dealing with a chronic disease, may result in clinical depression and its accompanying behavioral manifestations that promote extreme energy reservation.

== The third ventricle hypothesis ==
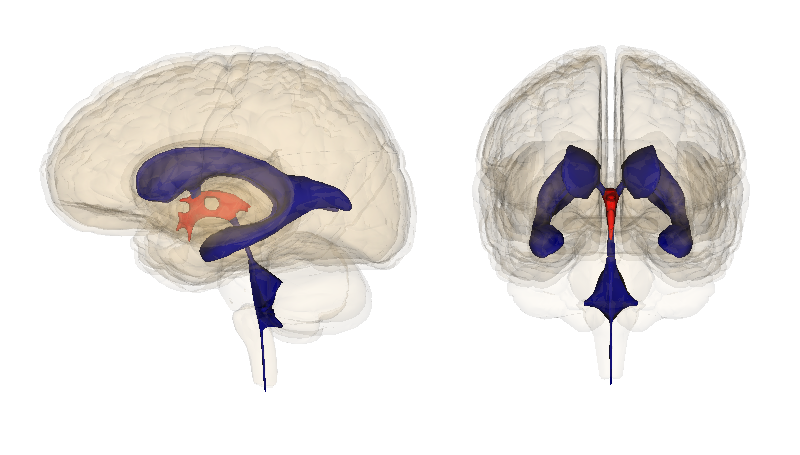
Third ventricle

The third ventricle hypothesis of depression proposes that the behavioural cluster associated with depression (hunched posture, avoidance of eye contact, reduced appetites for food and sex plus social withdrawal and sleep disturbance) serves to reduce an individual's attack-provoking stimuli within the context of a chronically hostile social environment. It further proposes that this response is mediated by the acute release of an unknown inflammatory agent (probably cytokine) into the third ventricular space. In support of this suggestion, imaging studies reveal that the third ventricle is enlarged in depressives.

== Reception ==
Clinical psychology and psychiatry have historically been relatively isolated from the field of evolutionary psychology. Some psychiatrists raise the concern that evolutionary psychologists seek to explain hidden adaptive advantages without engaging the rigorous empirical testing required to back up such claims. While there is strong research to suggest a genetic link to bipolar disorder and schizophrenia, there is significant debate within clinical psychology about the relative influence and the mediating role of cultural or environmental factors. For example, epidemiological research suggests that different cultural groups may have divergent rates of diagnosis, symptomatology, and expression of mental illnesses. There has also been increasing acknowledgment of culture-bound disorders, which may be viewed as an argument for an environmental versus genetic psychological adaptation. While certain mental disorders may have psychological traits that can be explained as 'adaptive' on an evolutionary scale, these disorders cause individuals significant emotional and psychological distress and negatively influence the stability of interpersonal relationships and day-to-day adaptive functioning.

== See also ==
- Evolutionary approaches to postpartum depression

General:

- Evolutionary psychology
- Evolutionary medicine
- Evolutionary psychiatry

== Videos ==
- TED Talk: Can Depression be Good for You?
