= Tim Noakes =

South African sports researcher

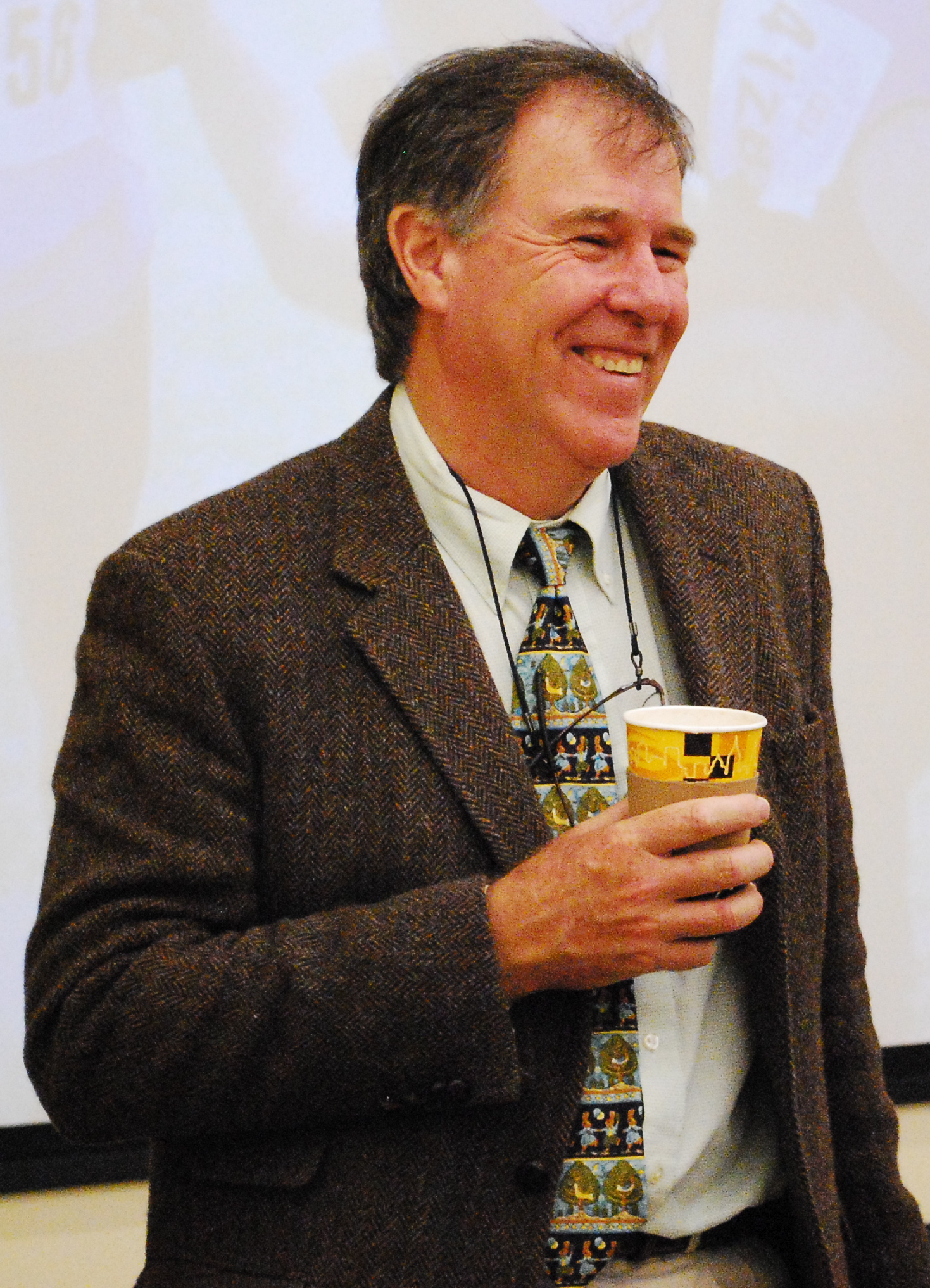
- Tim Noakes at West Point in 2009
- Born: Timothy David Noakes; 1949 (age 76–77); Salisbury, Southern Rhodesia (today Harare, Zimbabwe)
- Education: University of Cape Town; Diocesan College
- Known for: Central governor Theory of Fatigue; Hyponatremia research The "Noakes Diet"
- Awards: 2002: Doctor of Science (UCT); 2002: International Cannes Grand Prix Award; 2008: Order of Mapungubwe (Silver); 2011: honorary doctorate, Vrije Universiteit Amsterdam; 2012: Lifetime Achievement Award (South Africa's NRF); 2014: South Africa Medal (gold) (S2A3)
- Scientific career
- Fields: Exercise physiology
- Workplaces: University of Cape Town

Timothy David Noakes (born 1949) is a South African scientist and an emeritus professor in the Division of Exercise Science and Sports Medicine at the University of Cape Town.

He has run more than 70 marathons and ultramarathons, and is the author of several books on exercise and diet. He is known for his work in sports science and for his support of a low-carbohydrate, high-fat (LCHF, Banting) diet, as set out in his books The Real Meal Revolution and Lore of Nutrition: Challenging Conventional Dietary Beliefs.

== Education ==
Tim Noakes holds three higher education degrees from the University of Cape Town (UCT). He earned his MBChB (Bachelor of Medicine, Bachelor of Surgery) in 1974; MD (Doctor of Medicine) in 1981; DSc (Med) (Doctor of Science in Medicine) in 2002, specializing in Exercise Science. He also holds an honorary doctorate PhD (hc), awarded in 2011 by the University of Amsterdam.

== Background ==
Noakes was born in Salisbury, Southern Rhodesia (today Harare, Zimbabwe) in 1949 as the son of a third-generation tobacco exporter and moved to South Africa at the age of five. Noakes attended boarding school at Monterey Preparatory School in Constantia, Cape Town. Prep school was followed by Diocesan College, from which he matriculated in 1966.

== Career ==
In 1980 Noakes was tasked to start a sports science course at the University of Cape Town. Noakes went on to head the Medical Research Council-funded Bioenergetics of Exercise Research Unit, which was later changed to the MRC/UCT Research Unit for Exercise Science and Sports Medicine.

In the early 1990s Noakes co-founded the Sports Science Institute of South Africa.

He is a researcher on the condition now known as exercise-associated hyponatremia (EAH).

In 1996 Noakes published his theory of the "central governor". The theory proposed that fatigue is a "protective emotion" rather than a physiological state.

Noakes served on the selection panel for the International Olympic Committee’s Science Prize between 1995 and 2002.

In 2005 he undertook a series of experiments in the Arctic and Antarctic on South African (British-born) swimmer Lewis Gordon Pugh to understand human capability in extreme cold. He discovered that Pugh had the ability to raise his core body temperature before entering the water in anticipation of the cold and coined the phrase 'anticipatory thermo-genesis' to describe it. In 2007, Noakes was the expedition doctor for Pugh's one kilometre swim at the Geographic North Pole.

== The Noakes Diet ==
Noakes has characterised mainstream dietary advice, which emphasizes carbohydrate consumption, as "genocide", and instead advocates a low-carbohydrate, high-fat (LCHF) diet – a variation of the low-carbohydrate diet – often referred to in South Africa as the "Noakes Diet" (or, less commonly, the "Banting" diet). Noakes founded the Noakes Foundation in 2012 to help promote the diet, which is described in detail in Noakes's 2014 book The Real Meal Revolution. Noakes' father died from diabetes. Noakes believes his father's diet was instrumental in his decline, so following his own diagnosis with diabetes, Noakes changed his diet to a LCHF diet. He also reversed the carbohydrate-loading advice he had given previously to athletes, and which had featured extensively in his book Lore of Running. He has cited the effects of diabetes on his father and his father's life regrets as important motivation for his efforts to promulgate his dietary advice.

Despite following his diet, Noakes's fasting glucose levels barely budged, and he started taking the diabetes management drug metformin and dietary supplements to control the condition. He now describes himself as "cured" as long as he follows this regimen.

Registered dietician Megan Pentz-Kluyts said that omitting food groups, as Noakes's diet does, is the hallmark of fad diets not backed up by scientific evidence. After members of the Parliament of South Africa expressed support for his diet, fellow faculty members at the University of Cape Town accused him of making "outrageous, unproven claims about disease prevention" in an open letter they sent to the Cape Times. Wim de Villiers, dean of the faculty, accused Noakes of having no real scientific evidence to back up his assertions.

In February 2014 a registered dietician complained to the Health Professions Council of South Africa (HPCSA) that Noakes tweeted to a mother that she should wean her baby onto low-carbohydrate, high-fat foods, which he described as real foods. The HPCSA held a hearing about the allegation against Noakes over the next few years. Controversially, on 28 October 2016, the HPSCA incorrectly released a statement announcing that Noakes had been found guilty of misconduct, namely "giving unconventional advice over social media". In a second press release issued over three hours later, the HPSCA apologised for the mistake. Noakes was cleared of misconduct in April 2017. The HPSCA lost its appeal in June 2018 and the appeal committee dismissed the HPSCA's case by unanimous decision. Noakes commented: "Acquitted on all counts, twice, by two different judging panels".

Noakes co-wrote the 2017 book Lore of Nutrition with journalist Marika Sboros. In it Noakes describes his conversion to LCHF dieting, and writes that in his view the lipid hypothesis is the "biggest mistake in modern medicine". He details his struggles with the medical establishment. Paediatrician Alastair McAlpine criticised Noakes's Lore of Nutrition book as "bad science" in a review, to which Noakes responded.

Clinical dietitian Ingrid Schloss, citing a 2018 study, pointed out that no significant differences were found between low-fat and low-carb diets, and suggested that instead of the "fundamentalism" of the Noakes diet, people should be encouraged to reduce added sugar and refined grains; choose more whole foods, and include a wide variety of vegetables.

== Other controversies over public statements ==
In August 2014, Noakes tweeted: "Dishonest science. Proven link between autism and early immunisation covered up?". The tweet included a link to a video from disgraced ex-doctor and anti-vaccine activist Andrew Wakefield, in which Wakefield was repeating the conspiracy theory that the CDC is covering-up a link between vaccination and autism. Subsequently asked directly on Twitter if he thought there was a connection between the MMR vaccine and autism, Noakes responded: "Have no opinion. Focus of video was on wilful distortion of science and importance of whistleblowers. How did you miss it?"

Eduard Grebe, an epidemiologist and infectious disease specialist, has written that Noakes had "a long history of making misleading and false claims", including support for the false claim that MMR vaccines can cause autism and claiming that hydroxychloroquine was an effective treatment for COVID-19.

== Awards and achievements ==
In 2011 Noakes was awarded an honorary doctorate by the Vrije Universiteit Amsterdam, Netherlands. In 2014 the Southern Africa Association for the Advancement of Science (S2A3) awarded Noakes their prestigious South Africa Medal (gold) for his outstanding contributions to sport physiology.

== Selected publications ==
Noakes has written several books detailing his research in sports science and nutrition. A selected bibliography is given below.

- Lore of Running (1986)
- Running Injuries: How to Prevent and Overcome Them (1990)
- Lore of Cycling (1990)
- Running your Best (1995)
- Rugby without Risk (1996)
- Bob Woolmer’s Art and Science of Cricket (2008) with the late Bob Woolmer.
- Challenging Beliefs: Memoirs of a Career (2012)
- Waterlogged: The Serious Problem of Overhydration in Endurance Sports (2012)
- The Real Meal Revolution (2014)
- Raising Superheroes (2015)
- Lore of Nutrition: Challenging Conventional Dietary Beliefs, with Marika Sboros (2017)
- Real Food On Trial: How the diet dictators tried to destroy a top scientist, with Marika Sboros (2019)
