= Three Principles Psychology =

Psychology approach developed in the 1980s

Three Principles Psychology (TPP), previously known as Health Realization (HR), is a resiliency approach to personal and community psychology first developed in the 1980s by Roger C. Mills and George Pransky, who were influenced by the teachings of philosopher and author Sydney Banks. The approach first gained recognition for its application in economically and socially marginalized communities experiencing high levels of stress.

The foundational concepts of TPP are the three principles of mind, consciousness, and thought, which were originally articulated by Sydney Banks in the early 1970s. TPP teaches that an individual's psychological experience is shaped by their thought processes. TPP teaches that by recognizing the role of thought in shaping one's experience, individuals can transform their responses to situations by accessing what TPP refers to as "innate health" and "inner wisdom." TPP is also known by other names, including Psychology of Mind, Neo-cognitive Psychology, Innate Health, the Inside-Out Understanding and colloquially, the 3Ps.

== Model ==
In Three Principles Psychology, all psychological phenomena—from severe disorders to optimal mental health—are understood as manifestations of three operative "principles" first articulated by Sydney Banks as the basis of human experience and feeling states: mind, consciousness, and thought. In the TPP model, "mind" is often compared to the electricity powering a movie projector, while "thought" is likened to the images on the film. "Consciousness" is analogous to the light from the projector that casts the images onto the screen, making them appear real.

According to TPP, individuals experience reality and their circumstances through the continual filter of their thoughts. Consciousness gives this filtered reality the appearance of being "the way it really is," leading people to react to it as if it were absolute truth. However, when their thinking changes, their perception of reality shifts, and their reactions change accordingly. Thus, TPP posits that people are constantly creating their own experience of reality through their thoughts.

Also according to TPP, people tend to perceive their reality as stressful when they are engaged in insecure or negative thoughts. However, TPP suggests that these thoughts do not need to be taken seriously. By choosing to take such thoughts more lightly, the mind can quiet down, allowing positive feelings to emerge naturally. TPP teaches that everyone has an inherent capacity for health and well-being, referred to as "innate health," which surfaces when troubled thinking subsides. When this occurs, individuals also gain access to common sense and can tap into a universal capacity for creative problem-solving, known as "inner wisdom."

== Three Principles Psychology as therapy ==
In contrast to psychotherapies that focus on the content of the clients' dysfunctional thinking, TPP focuses on "innate health" and the role of "Mind, Consciousness and Thought" in creating the clients' experience of life.

The TPP counselor does not suggest to clients that they attempt to change their thoughts, "think positive", or "reframe" negative thoughts to positive ones. According to TPP, one's ability to control one's thoughts is limited and the effort to do so can itself be a source of stress. Instead, clients are encouraged to consider that their "minds are using thought continuously to determine their subjective, personal reality in each moment."

In the TPP model, feelings and emotions are seen as indicators of the quality of one's thinking. Unpleasant or stressful emotions, suggest that an individual's thinking is influenced by insecurity, negative beliefs, conditioning, or learned patterns that may be irrelevant to, and thereby distort, the present moment. These emotions also indicate a temporary lapse in recognizing one's role in shaping their own experience. Conversely, pleasant emotions—such as well-being, gratitude, compassion, or peace—indicate that one's thinking is aligned with what TPP considers optimal for the current situation.

TPP holds that the therapeutic "working through" of personal issues from the past to achieve wholeness is unnecessary. According to the TPP model, people are already whole and healthy. The traumas of the past are only important to the extent that the individual lets them influence his or her thoughts in the present. According to TPP, one's "issues" and memories are simply thoughts, and the individual can react to them or not. The more clients recognize that they are creating their own painful feelings through their "power of Thought," the less these feelings tend to bother them. Sedgeman compares this to making scary faces in the mirror: because we know it's just us, it's impossible to scare ourselves that way.

Thus TPP addresses personal insecurities and dysfunctional patterns en masse, aiming for an understanding of the "key role of thought", an understanding that ideally allows the individual to step free at once from a large number of different patterns all connected by insecure thinking. With this approach, it is rare for the practitioner to delve into specific content When specific thoughts are recognized as limiting or based on insecurity or conditioning, they often come with an uncomfortable feeling. The counselor points out that this understanding activates the body's homeostatic system, which naturally prefers feeling good over feeling bad. As a result, the individual has the capacity to let go of these thoughts if they choose to.

=== Relationships ===
From the perspective of TPP, relationship problems stem from a low awareness of each partner's role in creating their own experience through thought and consciousness. Partners who embrace TPP reportedly stop blaming and recriminating, leading to a different way of interacting. TPP counselors encourage couples to recognize that their feelings are not determined by their partner, and that most issues that previously disrupted their relationship were based on insecure, negative, and conditioned thinking.

Counselors also emphasize that everyone experiences emotional ups and downs, and that thinking during a "down" mood is likely to be distorted. TPP teaches that it is generally counterproductive to "talk through" relationship problems when partners are in a bad mood. Instead, TPP suggests waiting until both have calmed down and can discuss things from a place of inner comfort and security.

=== Chemical dependency and addiction ===
TPP views chemical dependency and related behaviors as a response to a lack of self-efficacy, rather than the result of disease. According to TPP, individuals who are "unaware" of their own "innate health" and their role in creating stress through their thoughts may turn to alcohol, drugs, or other compulsive behaviors in an attempt to quell their stressful feelings and regain a temporary sense of control.

TPP seeks to provide deeper relief by demonstrating that negative and stressful feelings are self-generated and can be self-quieted, offering a pathway to well-being that does not rely on external circumstances or substances.

== Application ==
Over the past forty years, Sydney Banks' "insight" has been applied in a wide range of settings, including hospitals, correctional institutions, social services, individual and couples therapy, community housing, drug and alcohol prevention and treatment programmes, schools and multi-national corporations.

=== Community applications ===
The Three Principles Psychology (TPP) model has been applied in a variety of challenging settings. An early project, which garnered national publicity under the leadership of Roger Mills, introduced TPP (then known as Health Realization (HR) to residents of two low-income housing developments in Miami known as Modello and Homestead Gardens. After three years, there were major documented reductions in crime, illegal drug trade, teenage pregnancy, child abuse, child neglect, school absenteeism, unemployment, and families on public assistance. Jack Pransky has chronicled the transformations that unfolded in his book Modello, A Story of Hope for the Inner City and Beyond.

Later projects in some of the most violence-affected housing developments in New York, Minnesota, and California, as well as in other communities in California, Hawaii, and Colorado, expanded on the foundational work done in Modello and Homestead Gardens. The Coliseum Gardens housing complex in Oakland, California, once had the fourth highest homicide rate among similar complexes in the U.S. However, after the introduction of HR classes, the homicide rate began to decrease significantly. Gang warfare and ethnic clashes between Cambodian and African-American youth ceased. In 1997, Sargeant Jerry Williams was awarded the California Wellness Foundation Peace Prize on behalf of the Health Realization Community Empowerment Project at Coliseum Gardens. By the year 2006, there had been no homicides in the Complex for nine straight years.

The TPP model has also found application in police departments, prisons, mental health clinics, community health clinics and nursing, drug and alcohol rehabilitation programs, services for the homeless, schools, and a variety of state and local government programs. The County of Santa Clara, California, for example, has established a Health Realization Services Division which provides HR training to County employees and the public. The Services Division "seeks to enhance the life of the individual by teaching the understanding of the psychological principles of Mind, Consciousness and Thought, and how these principles function to create our life experience... enabling them to live healthier and more productive lives so that the community becomes a model of health and wellness." The Department of Alcohol and Drug Services introduced HR in Santa Clara County in 1994. The Health Realization Services Division has an approved budget of over $800,000 (gross expenditure) for FY 2008, a 41% increase over 2007, at a time when a number of programs within the Alcohol and Drug Services Department have sustained budget cuts.

HR (TPP) community projects have received grant funding from a variety of sources. For example, grant partners for the Visitacion Valley Community Resiliency Project, a five-year, multimillion-dollar community revitalization project, have included Wells Fargo Bank, Charles Schwab Corporation Foundation, Charles and Helen Schwab Foundation, Isabel Allende Foundation, Pottruck Family Foundation, McKesson Foundation, Richard and Rhoda Goldman Fund, S.H. Cowell Foundation, San Francisco Foundation, Evelyn & Walter Haas Jr. Fund, Milagro Foundation, and Dresdner RCM Global Investors. Other projects based upon the HR (TPP) approach have been funded by the National Institute of Mental Health, the U.S. Department of Justice, the National Institute on Drug Abuse, the California Wellness Foundation, and the Shinnyo-en Foundation.

Ongoing community projects organized by the Center for Sustainable Change, a non-profit organization founded by Dr. Roger Mills and Ami Chen Mills-Naim, are funded by the W.K. Kellogg Foundation. The Center for Sustainable Change works in partnership with grassroots organizations in Des Moines, Iowa; Charlotte, North Carolina; and the Mississippi Delta to bring Three Principles training to at-risk communities under the umbrella of the National Community Resiliency Project. The center also works with schools, agencies and corporations.

=== Organizational applications ===
In the course of their exposure to Health Realization (HR), or the foundational concept referred to as Three Principles Psychology, individuals within the business realm have incorporated these principles into their respective professional domains. This assimilation has manifested as a discernible trend wherein practitioners, having grasped the core tenets, integrate and apply these ideas within their organizational contexts. The approach has been introduced to people in medicine, law, investment and financial services, technology, marketing, manufacturing, publishing, and a variety of other commercial and financial roles. It has been reported anecdotally to have had significant impact in the areas of individual performance and development, teamwork, leadership, change and diversity. According to HR/Three Principles adherents, these results flow naturally as the individuals exposed to the ideas learn how their thoughts have been creating barriers to others and barriers to their own innate creativity, common sense, and well-being. As people learn how to access their full potential more consistently, HR adherents say, they get better results with less effort and less stress in less time.

Two peer-reviewed articles on effectiveness with leadership development were published in professional journals in 2008 (ADHR) and 2009 (ODJ). See "Organizations and Business" section below (Polsfuss & Ardichvili).

== Philosophical context ==
The Three Principles rests on the non-academic philosophy of Sydney Banks, which Mr. Banks has expounded upon in several books. Mr. Banks was a day laborer with no education beyond ninth grade (age 14) in Scotland who, in 1973, reportedly had a profound insight into the nature of human experience. Mr. Banks does not particularly attempt to position his ideas within the larger traditions of philosophy or religion; he is neither academically trained nor well read. His philosophy focuses on the illusory, thought-created nature of reality, the Three Principles of "Mind", "Thought", and "Consciousness", the potential relief of human suffering that can come from a fundamental shift in personal awareness and understanding and the importance of a direct, experiential grasp of these matters, as opposed to a mere intellectual comprehension or analysis. Mr. Banks suggests that his philosophy is best understood not intellectually but by "listening for a positive feeling;" and a grasp of the Three Principles is said to come through a series of "insights," that is, shifts in experiential understanding.

== Teaching of The Three Principles ==
Three Principles Psychology (TPP), much like Sydney Banks's philosophy, is not presented as a collection of 'techniques.' Instead, it's an experiential 'understanding' that transcends the mere transfer of information. There are no steps, no uniformly appropriate internal attitudes, and no techniques within it. The "health of the helper" is considered crucial; that is, trainers or counselors ideally will "live in the understanding that allows them to enjoy life," and thereby continuously model their understanding of TPP by staying calm and relaxed, not taking things personally, assuming the potential in others, displaying common sense, and listening respectfully to all. Facilitators ideally teach in the moment, from "what they know" (e.g. their own experience), trusting that they will find the right words to say and the right approach to use in the immediate situation to stimulate the students' understanding of the "Three Principles". Rapport with students and a positive mood in the session or class are more important than the specific content of the facilitator's presentation.

== Evaluations ==
A 2007 peer-reviewed article evaluating the effectiveness of HR suggests that the results of residential substance abuse treatment structured around the teaching of HR are equivalent to those of treatment structured around 12-step programs. The authors note that "these results are consistent with the general findings in the substance abuse literature, which suggests that treatment generally yields benefits, irrespective of approach."

A small peer-reviewed study in preparation for a planned larger study evaluated the teaching of HR/Innate Health via a one-and-a-half-day seminar, as a stress and anxiety reduction intervention for HIV-positive patients. All but one of the eight volunteer participants in the study showed improved scores on the Brief Symptom Inventory after the seminar, and those participants who scored in the "psychiatric outpatient" range at the beginning of the seminar all showed improvement that was sustained upon follow-up one month later. The study's authors concluded that "The HR/IH psychoeducational approach deserves further study as a brief intervention for stress-reduction in HIV-positive patients."

A 2007 pilot study funded by the National Institutes of Health evaluated HR in lowering stress among Somali and Oromo refugee women who had experienced violence and torture in their homelands, but for whom Western-style psychotherapeutic treatment of trauma was not culturally appropriate. The pilot study showed that "the use of HR with refugee trauma survivors was feasible, culturally acceptable, and relevant to the participants." In a post-intervention focus group, "many women reported using new strategies to calm down, quiet their minds and make healthier decisions." Co-investigator Cheryl Robertson, Assistant Professor in the School of Nursing at the University of Minnesota, was quoted as saying, "This is a promising intervention that doesn't involve the use of highly trained personnel. And it can be done in the community."

The Visitacion Valley Community Resiliency Project (VVCRP) was reviewed by an independent evaluator hired by the Pottruck Foundation. Her final report notes that "Early program evaluation...found that the VVCRP was successful in reducing individuals' feelings of depression and isolation, and increasing their sense of happiness and self-control. The cumulative evaluation research conducted on the VVCRP and the HR model in general concludes that HR is a powerful tool for changing individuals' beliefs and behaviors."

== Research efforts on effectiveness ==
Published peer review research has demonstrated that peer-mentored three principles based programs can be highly effective in improving mental health and wellbeing. For example, Catherine-Gray and Denkers conducted a waitlist controlled trails with 127 volunteers from a prison located in the UK. All participants received normal prison programming (N=127), while the intervention group (n=66) received an additional 3-day intensive called Insight to Wellbeing. This study found higher levels of innate health, self-control, well-being, and prosocial behavior and lower levels of aggression within the intervention group and as compared with the control group. This study also conducted a mediation analysis to test if innate health, self-control, and/or social desirability bias could explain these positive changes. Importantly, innate health did play a mediating role equivalent to and/or partnering with self-control, whereas social desirability bias did not.

== Criticism ==
In a criticism of the philosophy of Sydney Banks and, by implication, the HR approach, Bonelle Strickling, a psychotherapist and Professor of Philosophy, is quoted in an article in the Vancouver Sun as objecting that "it makes it appear as if people can, through straightforward positive thinking, 'choose' to transcend their troubled upbringings and begin leading a contented life." She goes on to say that, "it can be depressing for people to hear it's supposed to be that easy. It hasn't been my experience that people can simply choose not to be negatively influenced by their past." Referring to Banks's own experience, she says, "Most people are not blessed with such a life-changing experience.... When most people change, it usually happens in a much more gradual way."

The West Virginia Initiative for Innate Health (at West Virginia University Health Sciences Center), which promotes HR/Innate Health and the philosophy of Sydney Banks through teaching, writing, and research, was the center of controversy soon after its inception in 2000 as the Sydney Banks Institute for Innate Health. Initiated by Robert M. D'Alessandri, the Dean of the medical school there, the institute was reportedly criticized as pushing "junk science," and Banks's philosophy was characterized as "a kind of bastardized Buddhism" and "New Age." William Post, an orthopedic surgeon who quit the medical school because of the institute, was reported, along with other unnamed professors, to have accused the Sydney Banks Institute of promoting religion in a state-funded institution. Harvey Silvergate, a civil-liberties lawyer, was quoted as agreeing that "essentially [the institute] seems like a cover for a religious-type belief system which has been prettified in order to be secular and even scientific."

A Dr. Blaha, who resigned as chairman of Orthopedics at WVU, was quoted as criticizing the institute as being part of a culture at the Health Sciences Center that, in his view, places too much emphasis on agreement, consensus, and getting along. Other professors reportedly supported the institute.

In contrast, Anthony DiBartolomeo, chief of the rheumatology section, was quoted as calling it, "a valuable addition" to the health-sciences center, saying its greatest value was in helping students, residents, and patients deal with stress.

Reportedly in response to the controversy, the WVIIH changed its name from The Sydney Banks Institute to the West Virginia Initiative for Innate Health, although its mission remains unchanged.

== See also ==
- Psychoneuroimmunology
- Solution focused brief therapy
- Social constructionism
- Focusing
- Positive psychology
