= Preferred walking speed =

Locomotion speed of animals and humans

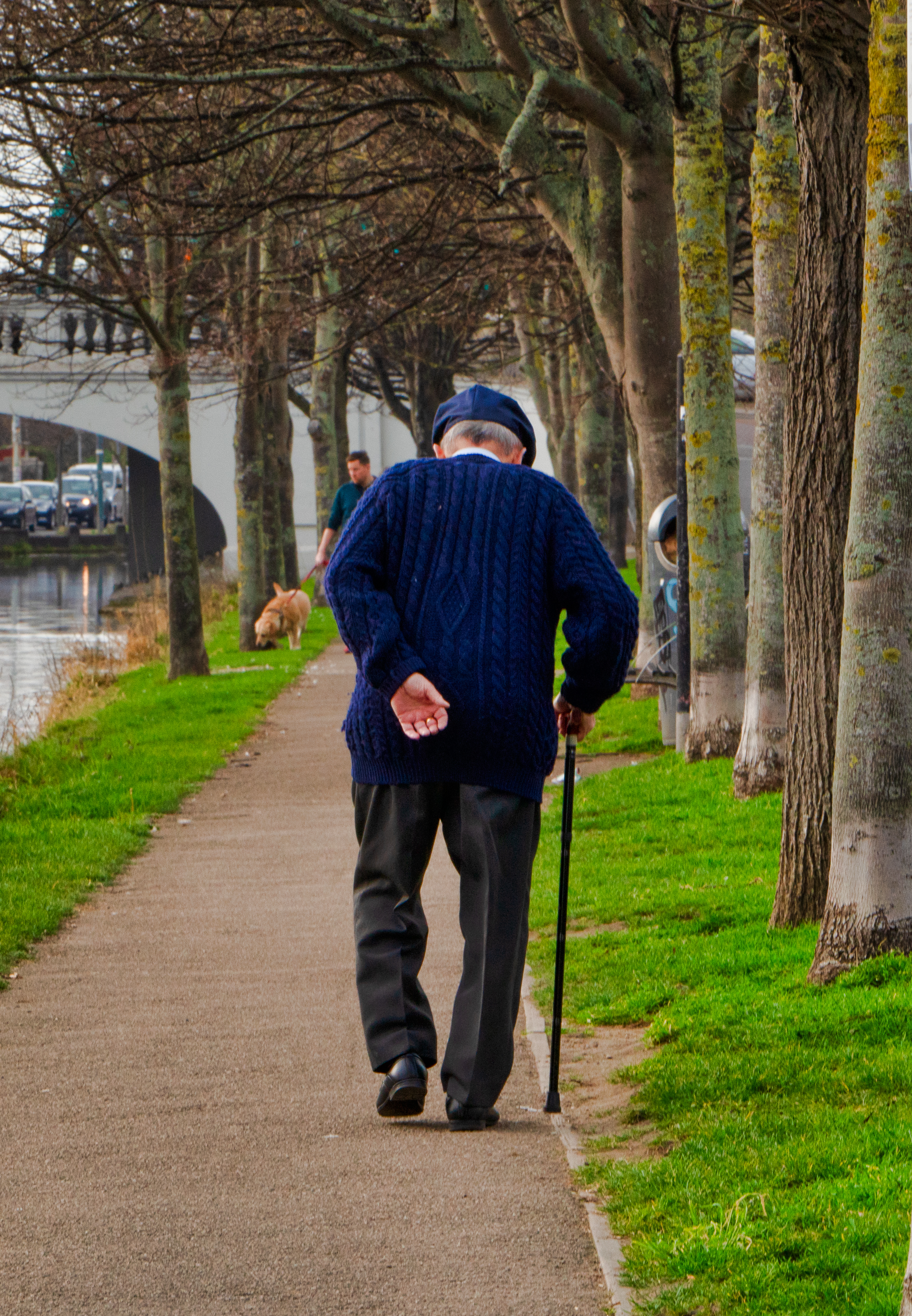
Older man walking with a stick

The preferred walking speed is the speed at which humans or animals choose to walk. For humans, it varies more by culture and available visual feedback than by body type, typically falling between 1.10 metres per second (4.0 km/h; 2.5 mph; 3.6 ft/s) and 1.65 metres per second (5.9 km/h; 3.7 mph; 5.4 ft/s). Individuals may find speeds slower or faster than their default uncomfortable.

Horses have also demonstrated narrow distributions of preferred walking speed within a given gait, which suggests that the process of speed selection may follow similar patterns across species. Preferred walking speed has important clinical applications as an indicator of mobility and independence. For example, elderly people or people suffering from osteoarthritis must walk more slowly. Improving (increasing) people's preferred walking speed is a significant clinical goal in these populations.

People have suggested mechanical, energetic, physiological and psychological factors as contributors to speed selection. Probably, individuals face a trade-off between the numerous costs associated with different walking speeds, and they select a speed which minimizes these costs. For example, they may trade off time to destination, which is minimized at fast walking speeds, and metabolic rate, muscle force or joint stress. These are minimized at slower walking speeds. Broadly, increasing value of time, motivation, or metabolic efficiency may cause people to walk more quickly. Conversely, aging, joint pain, instability, incline, metabolic rate and visual decline cause people to walk more slowly.

== Value of time ==
Commonly, individuals place some value on their time. Economic theory therefore predicts that value-of-time is a key factor influencing preferred walking speed.

Levine and Norenzayan (1999) measured preferred walking speeds of urban pedestrians in 31 countries and found that walking speed is positively correlated with the country's per capita GDP and purchasing power parity, as well as with a measure of individualism in the country's society. It is plausible that affluence correlates with actual value considerations for time spent walking, and this may explain why people in affluent countries tend to walk more quickly.

This idea is broadly consistent with common intuition. Everyday situations often change the value of time. For example, when walking to catch a bus, the value of the one minute before the bus departing may be worth 30 minutes of time (the time saved not waiting for the next bus). Supporting this idea, Darley and Bateson show that individuals who are hurried under experimental conditions are less likely to stop in response to a distraction, and so they arrive at their destination sooner.

Beyond an economic focus, environmental demands also control walking speed. Comparisons between urban and rural settings differ greatly. Urban environments such as New York City have a higher density of people, increasing sensory input including traffic crowding and heightened time-sensitivity, all of which increase the need for efficiency, in turn increasing walking speed. Conversely, rural environments place higher value on slower paced interactions with lower external stimulation and fewer immediate time constraints, aligning more with leisurely walking speeds and consistency. The differences in surrounding environments plays a role how time is valued and therefore may explain differences in walking speeds.

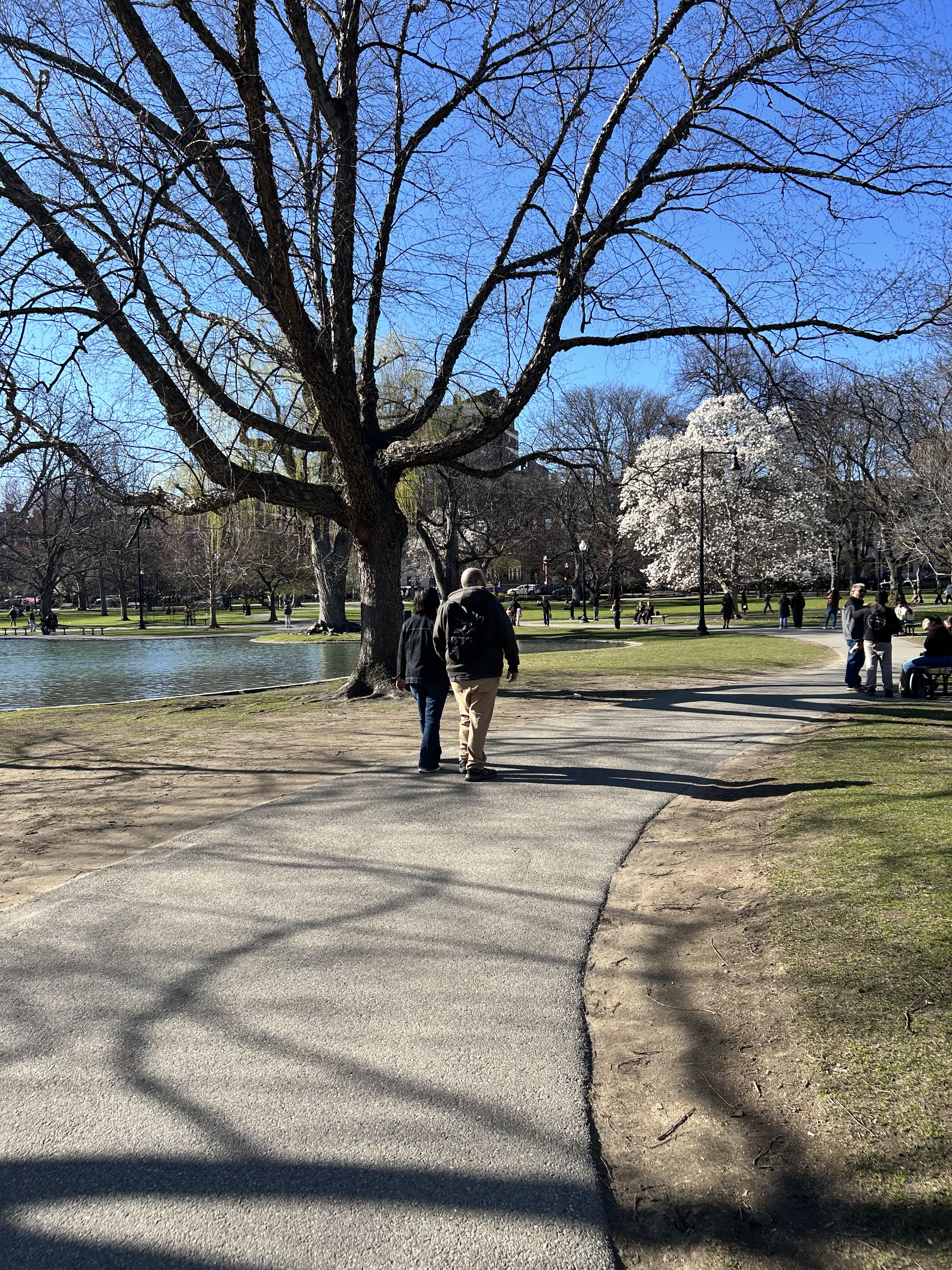
People walking in an urban park in Boston, MA, U.S.

In addition to broader urban versus rural differences, walking speed at local level is also effected by differences in the environment. Research that focuses on how added greenery affects daily life explains nature's impact on lifestyle. The presence of parks, and streets surrounded by trees reduces stress and is associated with slower walking speed. On the other hand, densely built areas with limited natural additions, are correlated with faster walking speeds. In these dense concrete jungles people feel less desire to reserve time to be restored by the surrounding environment and therefore have increased walking speeds that align with the need for faster transportation rather than walking for pleasure.

Economic reasoning and environmental demands together suggest that differences in walking speed across varying settings ultimately comes down do how a person values time. The fast-paced stimulation in urban environments paired with the need for efficiency and individual success may explain why urban walking is faster than in rural areas where walking is seen more as a form of exercise or hobby.

== Energetics ==
Energy minimization is widely considered a primary goal of the central nervous system. The rate at which an organism expends metabolic energy while walking (gross metabolic rate) increases nonlinearly with increasing speed. However, they also require a continuous basal metabolic rate to maintain normal function. The energetic cost of walking itself is therefore best understood by subtracting basal metabolic rate from total metabolic rate, yielding final metabolic rate. In human walking, net metabolic rate also increases nonlinearly with speed. These measures of walking energetics are based on how much oxygen people consume per unit time. Many locomotion tasks, however, require walking a fixed distance rather than for a set time. Dividing gross metabolic rate by walking speed results in gross cost of transport. For human walking, gross cost of transport is U-shaped. Similarly, dividing net metabolic rate by walking speed yields a U-shaped net cost of transport. These curves reflect the cost of moving a given distance at a given speed and may better reflect the energetic cost associated with walking.

Ralston (1958) showed that humans tend to walk at or near the speed that minimizes gross cost of transport. He showed that gross cost of transport is minimized at about 1.23 m/s (4.4 km/h; 2.8 mph), which corresponded to the preferred speed of his subjects. Supporting this, Wickler et al. (2000) showed that the preferred speed of horses both uphill and on the level corresponds closely to the speed that minimizes their gross cost of transport. Among other gait costs that human walkers choose to minimize, this observation has led many to suggest that people minimize cost and maximize efficiency during locomotion. Because gross cost of transport includes velocity, gross cost of transport includes an inherent value of time. Subsequent research suggests that individuals may walk marginally faster than the speed that minimizes gross cost of transport under some experimental setups, although this may be due to how preferred walking speed was measured.

In contrast, other researchers have suggested that gross cost of transport may not represent the metabolic cost of walking. People must continue to expend their basal metabolic rate regardless of whether they are walking, suggesting that the metabolic cost of walking should not include basal metabolic rate. Some researchers have therefore used net metabolic rate instead of gross metabolic rate to characterize the cost of locomotion. Net cost of transport reaches a minimum at about 1.05 m/s (3.8 km/h; 2.3 mph). Healthy pedestrians walk faster than this in many situations.

Metabolic input rate may also directly limit preferred walking speed. Aging is associated with reduced aerobic capacity (reduced VO_{2} max). Malatesta et al. (2004) suggests that walking speed in elderly individuals is limited by aerobic capacity; elderly individuals are unable to walk faster because they cannot sustain that level of activity. For example, 80-year-old individuals are walking at 60% of their VO2 max even when walking at speeds significantly slower than those observed in younger individuals.

== Biomechanics ==
Biomechanical factors such as mechanical work, stability, and joint or muscle forces may also influence human walking speed. Walking faster requires additional external mechanical work per step. Similarly, swinging the legs relative to the center of mass requires some internal mechanical work. As faster walking is accomplished with both longer and faster steps, internal mechanical work also increases with increasing walking speed. Therefore, both internal and external mechanical work per step increases with increasing speed. Individuals may try to reduce either external or internal mechanical work by walking more slowly, or may select a speed at which mechanical energy recovery is at a maximum.

Stability may be another factor influencing speed selection. Hunter et al. (2010) showed that individuals use energetically suboptimal gaits when walking downhill. He suggests that people may instead be choosing gait parameters that maximize stability while walking downhill. This suggests that under adverse conditions such as down hills, gait patterns may favor stability over speed.

Individual joint and muscle biomechanics also directly affect walking speed. Norris showed that elderly individuals walked faster when their ankle extensors were augmented by an external pneumatic muscle. Muscle force, specifically in the gastrocnemius and/or soleus, may limit walking speed in certain populations and lead to slower preferred speeds. Similarly, patients with ankle osteoarthritis walked faster after a complete ankle replacement than before. This suggests that reducing joint reaction forces or joint pain may factor into speed selection.

== Visual flow ==
The rate at which the environment flows past the eyes seems to be a mechanism for regulating walking speed. In virtual environments, the gain in visual flow can be decoupled from a person's actual walking speed, much as one might experience when walking on a conveyor belt. There, the environment flows past an individual more quickly than their walking speed would predict (higher than normal visual gain). At higher than normal visual gains, individuals prefer to walk more slowly, while at lower than normal visual gains, individuals prefer to walk more quickly. This behavior is consistent with returning the visually observed speed back toward the preferred speed and suggests that vision is used correctively to maintain walking speed at a value that is perceived to be optimal. Moreover, the dynamics of this visual influence on preferred walking speed are rapid—when visual gains are changed suddenly, individuals adjust their speed within a few seconds. The timing and direction of these responses strongly indicate that a rapid predictive process informed by visual feedback helps select preferred speed, perhaps to complement a slower optimization process that directly senses metabolic rate and iteratively adapts gait to minimize it.

== As exercise ==
With the wide availability of inexpensive pedometers, medical professionals recommend walking as an exercise for cardiac health and/or weight loss. The NIH gives the following guidelines:

Based on currently available evidence, we propose the following preliminary indices be used to classify pedometer-determined physical activity in healthy adults: (i). <5000 steps/day may be used as a 'sedentary lifestyle index'; (ii). 5000-7499 steps/day is typical of daily activity excluding sports/exercise and might be considered 'low active'; (iii). 7500-9999 likely includes some volitional activities (and/or elevated occupational activity demands) and might be considered 'somewhat active'; and (iv). >or=10000 steps/day indicates the point that should be used to classify individuals as 'active'. Individuals who take >12500 steps/day are likely to be classified as 'highly active'.

The situation becomes slightly more complex when preferred walking speed is introduced. The faster the pace, the more calories burned if weight loss is a goal. Maximum heart rate for exercise (220 minus age), when compared to charts of "fat burning goals" support many of the references that give the average of 1.4 metres per second (5.0 km/h; 3.1 mph; 4.6 ft/s), as within this target range. Pedometers average 100 steps a minute in this range (depending on individual stride), or one and a half to two hours to reach a daily total of 10,000 or more steps (100 minutes at 100 steps per minute would be 10,000 steps).

== In urban design ==
The typical walking speed of 1.4 metres per second (5.0 km/h; 3.1 mph; 4.6 ft/s) is recommended by design guides including the Design Manual for Roads and Bridges. Transport for London recommend 1.33 metres per second (4.8 km/h; 3.0 mph; 4.4 ft/s) in the PTAL methodology.

A 2001 study in Victoria, Australia, found the ratio of the 15th percentile walking speed to the average crossing speed is fairly consistent, with an average around 0.86.

== See also ==
- Footspeed, the maximum running speed
- Obesity and walking
- Naismith's rule
- Tobler's hiking function
- Transition from walking to running
