= Antalgic =

Antalgic is something to reduce pain, such as:

- Antalgic gait
- Analgesic medication
