= Foot strike =

Foot strike may refer to:

- Foot strike (gait) – how the foot contacts the ground when walking or running.
- A strike (attack) using the foot, such as a kick.
