= Pigeon gait =

Form of gait abnormality

Pigeon gait, also known as in-toeing gait, is a form of gait abnormality where feet have an inward rotation.

== Presentation ==
Torsional abnormalities.

- Hip dysplasia

== See also ==
- Pigeon toe (in-toeing)
- Gait abnormality
