= Specific resistance =

Specific resistance may refer to:

- Specific electrical resistance (also known as electric resistivity)
- Specific airway resistance (R_{aw}/functional residual capacity (FRC)
- Cost of transport - specific resistance due to friction for a mechanism transporting mass
