= Running energetics =

Study of the energy cost of running

Running energetics is the study of the energy cost of running. It is clear in the vast majority of species that as running speed increases the energetic cost of running increases. It also has long been known that between and within species variability exists in the energy cost of running a given speed. This variability has led to the study of biomechanical or physiological factors that may be predictive of the energy cost to run both between and within species.

In humans there is evidence that the cost to run at a given speed may be predictive of endurance performance. As a result, it has become common to examine the factors that influence the energy cost of running in an attempt to predict or improve running performance. There are many factors that may affect the energy cost of running, including age, training, stride rate and frequency, shoe weight, wind resistance, and even air density.

== Quantifying and expressing running energetics ==
The energetic cost of running can be quantified through the measurement of oxygen consumption (VO2) during running at a given submaximal speed. During aerobic activities (like submaximal running), VO2 provides an indirect estimate of energy expenditure. As a result, an increase in the rate of oxygen consumption is representative of an increase in energy expenditure. VO2 is often measured in absolute terms (ex. Liters/min), but in weight bearing activities, such as running, body mass can have a profound influence on energy expenditure. As a result, it is common to express energy expenditure as the rate of oxygen consumption in relation to body mass (ex. ml/kg/min).

Though some recent data may suggest otherwise, it is traditionally well accepted that a strong linear relationship exists between the rate of oxygen consumption and running speed (see figure 1), with energy expenditure increasing with increasing running speed. It is important that the measurement of energy expenditure through oxygen consumption is obtained at submaximal intensities. As running speed is increased to very high relative intensities, VO2 measures become a less reliable measure of energy expenditure. This is due to an increased reliance on anaerobic metabolism to provide the energy to run at these fast speeds.

The energy expenditure of running can be measured using the Metabolic equivalent of task (MET), where one MET is roughly equivalent to the energy cost of sitting quietly. The following table shows the MET values of running at differing speeds.

MET	Speed (MPH)
6.5	4 to 4.2
7.8	4.3 to 4.8
8.5	5.0 to 5.2
9	5.5 -5.8
9.3	6-6.3
10.5	6.7
11	7
11.8	7.5
12	8
12.5	8.6
13	9
14.8	9.3 to 9.6
14.8	10
16.8	11
18.5	12
19.8	13
23	14

There are many ways to express the energy cost of running. It is common to express the energetic cost of running as the energy cost to travel a given distance. This measure is often referred to as the cost of transport (COT). COT can be expressed in many ways. Two common methods of expressing COT are as oxygen consumed over a given distance (ex. ml/kg/km) or caloric energy expenditure over a given distance (ex. kcal/kg/km).

== Comparative Running Energetics: Scaling of energetic cost of running ==
Over the years, many factors have been examined in order to explain variation in running energy expenditure across species. Some of these factors were examined well over a century ago when Zuntz discovered in 1897 that the energetic cost of animals of similar mass to run a given distance was independent of limb number. In other words, there is no difference in the energetic cost to run a given distance as a quadruped or as a biped provided the animals are similar in body weight. Since Zuntz, a large amount of evidence has suggested that the COT decreases in direct proportion to body weight, with larger animals exhibiting a lower COT than smaller animals.

More recently, it has been proposed that an accurate prediction of the energy cost of running at a given speed can be made from the time available to generate force to support body weight. This theory suggests that smaller animals must take shorter, quicker steps to travel a given distance than larger animals. As a result, they have shorter foot ground contact times and less time to produce force on the ground. Due to this decreased amount of time to produce force, smaller animals must rely more heavily on metabolically costly fast muscle fibers to produce force to run at a given speed. Conversely, larger animals take slower and longer steps, contributing to an increase in the amount of time the foot is in contact with the ground during running. This longer contact time allows larger animals a greater amount of time to produce force. As a result, larger animals do not recruit as many metabolically costly fast muscle fibers in order to run a given speed. All of these factors result in a greater COT in smaller animals in comparison to larger animals.

There is some evidence that differences in COT across speed exist between species. It has been observed that quadrupeds exhibit optimal speeds within gaits. Meaning that there are speeds at which the energetic cost to run a given distance is minimized. In humans, it is commonly thought that the COT remains constant across all submaximal running speeds, though a recent study has challenged this assumption. If this is true, the energetic cost of running a mile fast or slow in humans is the same, and no optimal speed of running exists for humans.

Between humans there is a great deal of individual variability observed in energy expenditure during running at a given submaximal speed. A multitude of factors have been shown to exert an influence on the cost of human running. As a result, the apparent variability in the cost of human running may be a result of a variety of factors (see Running Economy/Introduction section). Some have suggested that sex may have an influence on the cost of running. Though there is some evidence that sex can influence the energetic cost of human running, especially among elite distance runners, differences in the energetic cost of running on the basis of sex are largely unclear.

== Running economy ==
The energy cost of running between individuals is extremely variable, even when normalized for body mass. This suggests that a variety of other factors must influence the energy cost of running. The apparent individual variability of energy expenditure during running spurred the development of the concept of economy. Economy is defined as the energy expended to meet the aerobic demands of a given submaximal activity. A measure of running economy should allow for comparison of the energy cost of running between individuals or groups of individuals. If an individual expends less energy to perform a given task (in the case of running, to run a given speed) they are considered more economical.

=== Measures of economy ===
There are many ways to compare economy between individuals. It is common to compare the energy expended to run at a given fixed speed, usually by measuring oxygen consumed while running at a fixed speed (ml/kg/min). This method does provide a comparison of economy at this given speed, but may often not provide an adequate representation of economy as a predictor of performance. This is especially true when comparing well-trained runners to untrained or lesser-trained individuals. In these cases comparing energy expenditure (as oxygen consumption) at a fixed speed often does not provide a comparison of energy expenditure at race pace. Because oxygen consumption increases with speed, it is difficult to get a precise depiction of economy from measuring oxygen consumption at a single speed. As a result, it is common to measure oxygen consumption across a wide range of speeds within individuals in order to get a more accurate assessment of economy.

It is also common to measure the cost of transport (COT), or the energetic cost to travel a given distance, in order to make comparisons of economy between individuals. Because this value is thought to remain constant across speed, the measurement of the COT at any single fixed submaximal speed is thought to provide an adequate representation of an individual's economy. This would allow for comparisons of economy to be made between untrained individuals running at their preferred submaximal speed (for example, 161 m/min, ~6 mph) to well-trained runners running at their preferred submaximal speed (for example, 268–320 m/min, ~10-12 mph). For this reason, it is common to use the COT in order to compare running economy between groups of different training and performance levels.

=== Factors influencing running economy ===
There are many factors that may influence running economy. One factor that has consistently been observed to influence the energy expenditure (and thus economy) during running, is training status. Well-trained runners are often found to be significantly more economical than untrained individuals. Also, performance level has been observed to influence the energy expenditure of running at a given speed, even within groups of trained runners. For example, elite runners are often more economical than sub-elite or average runners. This suggests that running economy, or the energy cost of running at a given submaximal speed, may be a valid predictor of performance especially within homogeneous groups of trained runners. There is also evidence that intense endurance training can improve economy within an individual.

== See also ==
- Effect of gait parameters on energetic cost
- Gait analysis
