= Marche à petit pas =

Type of gait disorder

Marche à petits pas [maʁʃ a pəti pa] (“gait with little steps”) is a type of gait disorder characterised by an abnormal short stepped gait with upright stance (in strict sense, as opposed to generally stooping short-stepped gait of Parkinson's disease), seen in various neurological (or sometimes muscular) disorders. It can be further differentiated from "Parkinsonian gait" by normal arm swing (as opposed to no arm swing in Parkinsonism). This is associated with frontal lobe white matter lesions.

== Common causes ==
Marche à petit pas gait is seen in:

- Bilateral diffuse cortical dysfunction
  - Diffuse cerebrovascular disease ('lacunar state')
- Normal pressure hydrocephalus
- Multiple sclerosis
- Parkinsonism (sometimes)
- Muscle weakness
