= J. H. Muirhead =

British philosopher (1855-1940)

- Born: John Henry Muirhead; 28 April 1855; Glasgow, Scotland
- Died: 24 May 1940 (aged 85); Rotherfield, Sussex (now East Sussex), England

Education
- Education: University of Glasgow; Balliol College, Oxford

Philosophical work
- Era: 20th-century philosophy
- Region: Western philosophy
- School: British idealism

John Henry Muirhead (28 April 1855 – 24 May 1940) was a Scottish philosopher best known for having initiated the Muirhead Library of Philosophy in 1890. He became the first person named to the Chair of Philosophy at the University of Birmingham in 1900.

== Biography ==
Born in Glasgow, Muirhead was educated at Gilbertfield House School, the Glasgow Academy (1866–70), and proceeded to Glasgow University, where he was deeply influenced by the Hegelianism of Edward Caird, the Professor of Moral Philosophy. He graduated MA in 1875. The same year he won a Snell exhibition at Balliol College, Oxford, to which he went up in Trinity Term 1875. His Library was originally published by Allen & Unwin and continued through to the 1970s.

His Library is seen as a crucial landmark in the history of modern philosophy, publishing a number of prominent 20th century philosophers including Brand Blanshard, Francis Herbert Bradley, Axel Hagerstrom, Henri Bergson, Edmund Husserl, Bernard Bosanquet, Irving Thalberg, Jr., Georg Wilhelm Hegel, Bertrand Russell and George Edward Moore. In 2002, the Library was made available in a 95 volume set (ISBN 0-415-27897-X).

Muirhead was a philosophical idealist and was involved in the British idealist movement.

== Selected bibliography ==
- The Inner Life in Relation to Morality: A Study in the Elements of Religion (an article in International Journal of Ethics January 1891, pages 169 to 186)
- The Elements of Ethics: an Introduction to Moral Philosophy (1892) - Charles Scribner's Sons, New York.
- Abstract and Practical Ethics (an article in American Journal of Sociology November 1896, Volume II, pages 341 to 357).
- Chapters from Aristotle's Ethics (1900) - John Murray, London.
- Philosophy and Life; and other Essays (1902) - Swan Sonnenschein & Co. Ltd, London.
- Wordsworth's Ideal of Early Education (an article in International Journal of Ethics April 1904, pages 339 to 352).
- The Service of the State: four lectures on the Political Teaching of T. H. Green (1908) - John Murray, London.
- The Ethical Aspect of the New Theology (an article in International Journal of Ethics April 1904 January 1910, pages 129 to 140).
- German Philosophy in relation to the War (1915) - John Murray, London.
- Social Purpose: a contribution to a Philosophy of Civic Society with H. J. W. Hetherington (1918) - London: G. Allen & Unwin; New York: Macmillan.
- The Life and Philosophy of Edward Caird (written with Sir Henry Jones) (1921) – Maclehose, Jackson and Co., Glasgow.
- Coleridge as Philosopher (1930) - Macmillan, New York.
- The Platonic Tradition in Anglo-Saxon Philosophy: Studies in the History of Idealism in England and America (1931) - London: G. Allen & Unwin; New York: Macmillan.
- The Use of Philosophy: Californian Addresses (1979) - Greenwood Press.
- Rule and End in Morals (1969) - Books for Libraries Press
