= Heel strike =

Heel strike may refer to:

- Heel strike (gait) – the foot contacting the ground heel-first during the foot strike phase of walking or running.
- A strike (attack) using the heel, such as a stomp.
