= Route card =

A route card is a document that is used by hillwalkers as an aid to navigation and route planning. The military also use a similar technique for planning night marches and/or patrols.

== Core information: The planned route ==
The planned route is broken down into discrete sections termed "legs" or "stages". Whenever possible, each leg will start and finish at a clearly defined topographical feature such as a lake, knoll, saddle, stream junction and so on. In most cases the legs are defined as being the longest section that might be safely followed on a single compass bearing. The object is to split the overall route into sections that can be readily undertaken in conditions of poor visibility such as in cloud, fog or at night.

In addition to the compass bearing, for each leg the total distance will be measured as well as the height gained or lost and the steepness of the ground. Using this information an estimated time to complete the leg will be calculated usually using Naismith's Rule or one of its variations. These times are then added to estimate the total time needed for the expedition.

For each leg note may also be taken of potential sources of danger along the route such as cliffs or of handrail/collecting features to aid in confirming the route.

== Additional information ==
For formal expeditions or excursions the leader may include the following information.

- Composition of the party with the names of the members, car registration numbers.
- Actual start time and date.
- Estimated time and date of arrival at finish.
- Mobile telephone number and/or radio frequencies in use.
- Notes regarding special equipment carried, tents, emergency shelters, food etc.

A copy of the route card is then left with a responsible person so as to assist the emergency services in the event that the group should suffer a mishap. This also avoids groups being reported as missing prematurely or without due cause.

== Use of route cards ==
In typical use, the route card will not be followed exactly by the party leader but is used as a backup if conditions deteriorate. When following legs on a compass bearing, the estimated time is not usually used as a precise indicator of when the leg is over but as a kind of fail-safe to stop the group from overshooting the actual objective and getting lost. If a precise estimate is needed, pace-counting may be used instead if terrain permits. Nowadays, it is typical to enter the co-ordinates from the route card into a handheld GPS unit and use this in conjunction with a compass if conditions deteriorate. In some cases, each member of the expedition may memorize a section of the route and have their own compass preset to the relevant bearing. This is a particular technique for military night patrols where the soldiers each lead a section of the route.

== Use of Moon route cards ==
Military uses these to assist a planned route for night navigation same as a route card.

It is very simply a route card just showing the legs or stages of the route. Some commanders have a full detailed route card as well as the moon route card when doing night navigation.

The two reasons for this is that you can pull the Moon card out on the march and hold it up to the moon light to check the bearing or grid reference of the next leg, and to stop you getting out your torch and giving your position away.
