= Muirhead Library of Philosophy =

The Muirhead Library of Philosophy was an influential series which published some of the best writings of twentieth century philosophy. The original programme was drawn up by John Muirhead and published in Erdmann's History of Philosophy in 1890. This statement was published in slightly altered form in subsequent volumes:

"The Muirhead Library of Philosophy was designed as a contribution to the History of Modern Philosophy under the heads: first of Different Schools of Thought — Sensationalist, Realist, idealist, Intuitivist; secondly of different Subjects — Psychology, Ethics, Political Philosophy, Theology. While much had been done in England in tracing the course of evolution in nature, history, economics, morals and religion, little had been done in tracing the development of thought on these subjects. Yet 'the evolution of opinion is part of the whole evolution'."

The Muirhead Library of Philosophy was originally published by Allen & Unwin and continued through to the 1970s. The series has since slipped from view with the waning of the influence of some of the published philosophers. However, the importance of this series can be judged by the list of masterpieces in Frank Magill's World Masterpieces of Philosophy in Digest Form (1952-75) which included many of the works from this series in its overview of twentieth century philosophy. Routledge has now re-issued 95 volumes from this series.

Among the authors published were: Henri Bergson, Max Black, Brand Blanshard, Bernard Bosanquet, F. H. Bradley, G. S. Brett, Ernst Cassirer, Roderick Chisholm, J. N. Findlay, Axel Hägerström, Nicolai Hartmann, G. W. F. Hegel, R. J. Hirst, Edmund Husserl, A. H. Johnson, Joel Kupperman, Morris Lazerowitz George Edward Moore, John Henry Muirhead, H. J. Paton, H. H. Price, Sarvepalli Radhakrishnan, Bertrand Russell, G. F. Stout, William Marshall Urban, and others.

Some of the books in the series were:

- Henri Bergson, Time and Free Will
- Brand Blanshard, The Nature of Thought
- Brand Blanshard, Reason and Analysis
- Bernard Bosanquet, History of Aesthetic
- G. S. Brett, A History of Psychology 3 vols.
- H. W. Cassirer, Kant's First Critique: An Appraisal of the Permanent Significance of Kant's Critique of Pure Reason
- Roderick Chisholm, Person and Object
- J. N. Findlay, Ascent to the Absolute: Metaphysical Papers and Lectures
- J. N. Findlay, Discipline of the Cave
- J. N. Findlay, Hegel: A Re-Examination
- J. N. Findlay, Language, Mind and Value
- J. N. Findlay, Values and Intentions: A Study in Value-Theory and Philosophy of Mind
- Axel Hagerstrom, Philosophy and Religion, (1964, translated by Robert T. Sandin)
- Nicolai Hartmann, Ethics
- G. W. F. Hegel, The Phenomenology of The Mind
- G. W. F. Hegel, The Philosophy of Nature
- G. W. F. Hegel, The Science of Logic
- R. J. Hirst, Problems of Perception
- Edmund Husserl, Ideas: General Introduction to Pure Phenomenology
- A. H. Johnson, Experiential Realism
- Joel Kupperman, Ethical Knowledge
- Nicholas Malebranche, Dialogues on Metaphysics
- Wilbur Marshall Urban, Language and Reality
- Wilbur Marshall Urban, Valuation
- G. E. Moore, Philosophical Papers
- G. E. Moore, Some Main Problems in Philosophy
- H. J. Paton, The Good Will
- H. J. Paton, Kant's Metaphysic of Experience
- Sarvepalli Radhakrishnan, The Principal Upanisads
- Bertrand Russell, Introduction to Mathematical Philosophy
- G. F. Stout, Analytic Psychology
