= William W. Naismith =

Scottish accountant and mountaineer

William Wilson Naismith
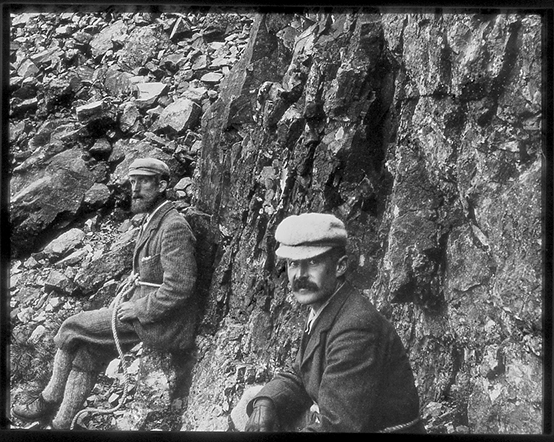
- William Naismith (right) and on the left, John MacKenzie, known as the UK's first professional mountain guide.
- Born: 28 February 1856; Hamilton, Scotland
- Died: 27 September 1935 (aged 79); Strathpeffer
- Citizenship: Scottish
- Education: University of Glasgow
- Occupation: accountant
- Known for: Naismith's rule Pioneering new routes in Scottish mountain ranges

William Wilson Naismith (28 February 1856 – 27 September 1935) was a Scottish accountant and mountaineer. He was a key founder of the Scottish Mountaineering Club and created the eponymous Naismith's rule, used to determine the time necessary to walk a route with a given length and elevation gain.

== Early life ==
Born on 28 February 1856, Naismith was the elder child of Mary Anne Murray and William Naismith, a physician. He was raised in Hamilton, South Lanarkshire and attended Gilbertfield House School. At an early age, his parents introduced him to mountain climbing in the Scottish Highlands; he climbed Ben Lomond at the age of nine, made a winter ascent of Beinn Bhreac by fourteen and hiked 56 miles (90 km) from his family home in Auchincampbell to the top of Tinto and back. After school, he completed a degree in accounting at the University of Glasgow.

== Climbing career ==
Naismith began climbing seriously in the 1880s. His difficult ascent of Ben More in 1884 led him to the belief that Scotland's mountains demanded the same level of respect as those in the Alps, and in January 1889 he had a letter published in the Glasgow Herald proposing the formation of a "Scottish Alpine Club". After receiving numerous responses, he and others founded the Scottish Mountaineering Club in March 1889. Naismith, regarded as "the father of the club", was its first treasurer.

Naismith made several first ascents throughout his career. In 1894 he was the first to climb (and name) Tower Ridge on the UK's highest mountain, Ben Nevis; in 1896 he made the first winter ascent of the mountain's North-East Buttress; and in 1898 he ascended its Staircase Climb for the first time. He became the first to climb Crowberry Ridge of Buachaille Etive Mòr in 1896 by a route now known as Naismith's Route. He was also a proficient skier, and made the first recorded expedition on skis in Scottish history when he skied through the Campsie Fells in 1890. In 1895 he became the first person to explore a frozen-over Loch Lomond on ice skates.

He is perhaps best known for conceiving Naismith's rule, a method for estimating the amount of time it will take to walk a route according to its distance and elevation gain. According to the rule, a fit individual can walk roughly 3 miles (4.8 km) in an hour, with an additional hour for every 2,000 feet (610 m) of altitude gained.

== Later life ==
Naismith lived in Glasgow from 1905 onwards and attended the Kelvinside Hillhead Parish Church, Glasgow where he was an elder for 27 years. He married Edith A.W. Barron in 1926 when he was 70 years old. On 27 September 1935, he died suddenly of heart failure at Strathpeffer and was buried on 1 October 1935 at the Bent Cemetery in his hometown of Hamilton.
