= Canine gait =

Quality of movement of a dog

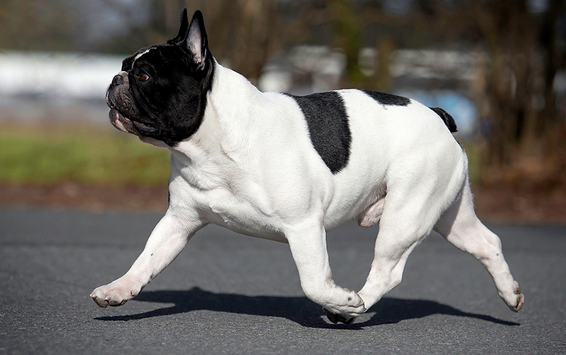
A French Bulldog trotting

The gait of a dog is its quality of movement. It is given a great deal of importance in the breed standard of some breeds, of lesser importance in other standards, and in some breeds gait is not described in the standard at all. A dog's gait is similar to a horse's.

A dog judge must know the gait requirements in the Standard of the breed they are judging. The Miniature Pinscher, for example, must have what is called a hackney gait, reminiscent of the gait of a horse. In working small breeds such as the Miniature Fox Terrier, a hackney gait is a serious or disqualifying fault.

== Types of gait ==
Walk
Gaiting pattern in which three legs are in support of the body at all times, each foot lifting from the ground one at a time in regular sequence.

Amble
A relaxed, easy gait in which the legs on either side move almost, but not quite, as a pair. Often seen as the transition movement between the walk and other gaits.

Pace
The pace is a two-beat gait with two lateral legs moving in unison. Example:
- Left front and left hind (LF and LH)
- Right front and right hind (RF and RH)
The pace is often used by puppies until their muscles develop more. When they do the puppies switch to the trot. It can also be used by overweight dogs or dogs that need to conserve energy.

Trot
A rhythmic two-beat diagonal gait in which the feet at diagonal opposite ends of the body strike the ground together; i.e., right hind with left front and left hind with right front.

Flying trot
A fast gait in which all four feet are off the ground for a brief period during each half stride. Because of the long reach, the oncoming hind feet step beyond the imprint left by the front. Also called suspension trot.

Canter
The canter is a three-beat gait. The pattern is a hind foot, the opposite hind foot and its front diagonal, followed by the other front foot and suspension when present. This gait is often used to travel over long distances because it is smooth and energy conserving. The canter is usually slower than the trot, but can be easily shifted to the faster gallop. The canter is an asymmetrical gait; the limb pattern is different depending on which front leg leads. The dog is said to be in either "right lead" or "left lead" when the front right leg or front left leg is in the lead. The leading leg is not part of the diagonal. Example:
- Left hind
- Right hind and left front
- Right front (leading leg)

Single suspension gallop
The single suspension gallop is a four-time gait. The dog supports its weight with its feet in the unsymmetrical sequence: RF, LF, RH, LH (it can happen that the two limbs LF and RH hit the ground simultaneously). Just after taking off from the front left foot the dog achieves suspension. Each front foot must be lifted off of the ground before its corresponding rear foot is set down. The rear foot may hit the corresponding front foot if the timing is wrong.

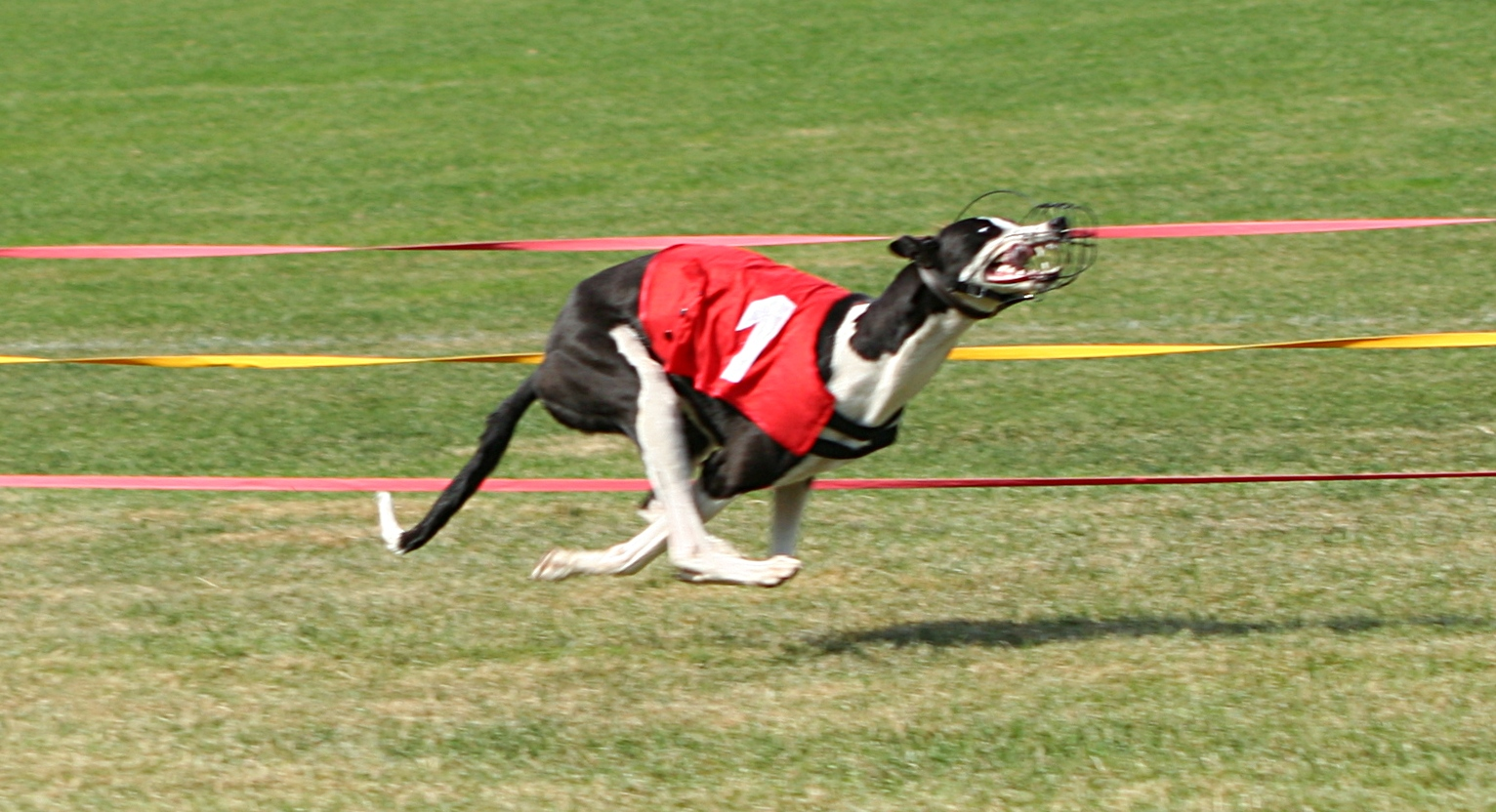
A greyhound at full contraction

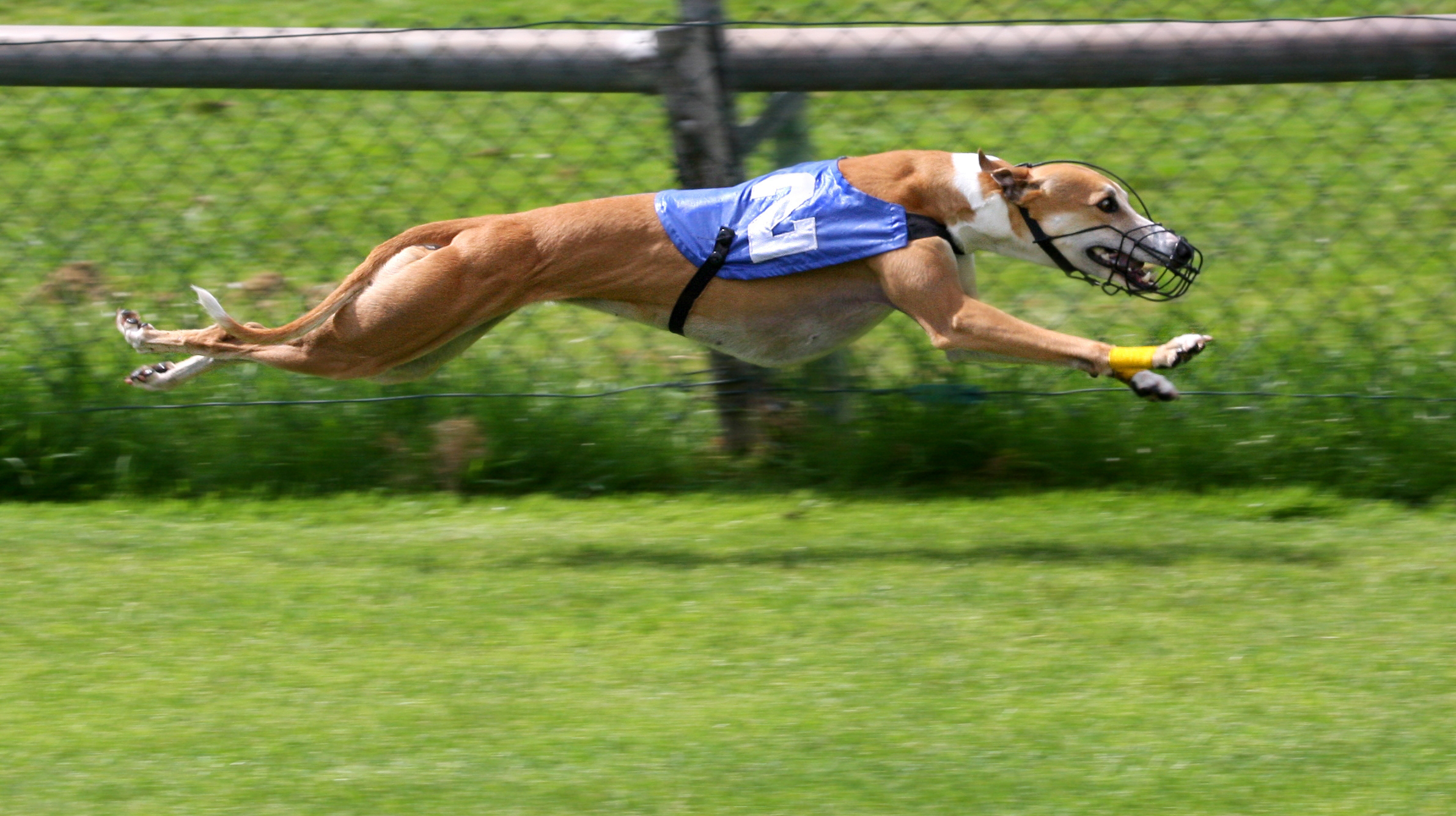
A racing greyhound at full extension

Double suspension gallop
The double suspension gallop is also a four-time gait. The dog's weight, however, is not supported by the feet in the sequence of the single suspension gallop. Just after taking off from the LF and just after taking off from the RF suspension occurs. This is the only gait in which a dog is in full extension. The front legs are in full extension forward while the rear legs are in full extension rearward. Additionally, the dog's back is folded and attains maximum overreach, or where the rear feet extend in front of the front feet and the front feet extend behind the rear feet. When the feet pass each other, the front feet are inside of the rear feet.

A dog uses its back to attain speed. The back's most flexible point is just over the loin area, and the tuck-up allows for the folding of the under portion of the dog's body. The rear legs overreach on the outside of the front legs. Essential for a fast dog is the ability to flex its back from a straight position to an arched position. A permanent arch is inflexible and is considered a serious fault. The double suspension gallop is a leaping gait, with the hind legs first propelling the dog into the air and then followed by the front legs propelling. The shoulder muscles, the ham muscles and the back muscles are the engines of this motion.

Although speed is gained by animals using this gait, endurance will be sacrificed. Sighthounds and some cats can rapidly overtake their prey, but if the chase continues for too long then their prey can escape. Dogs with short legs, as well as other short-legged mammals like the weasel, often use this gait.

== Medical use ==
Evaluation of musculoskeletal and neurologic conditions requires canine gait analysis. This involves visual observation from several angles and may require use of new objective technologies for gait analysis including kinematic gait analysis, kinetic gait analysis (force plate analysis), and temporospatial gait analysis (pressure sensing walkways). These may be especially important for dogs competing in sporting events and in working dogs.
