= Antalgic gait =

Any form of walking meant to reduce pain

An antalgic gait is a gait that develops as a way to avoid pain while walking (antalgic = anti- + alge, "against pain"). It is a form of gait abnormality where the stance phase of gait is abnormally shortened relative to the swing phase. It is a good indication of weight-bearing pain.

== Conditions associated with an antalgic gait ==
- Coxalgia
- Leg cramps
- Legg–Calvé–Perthes disease (LCPD)
- Osteoarthritis
- Pelvic girdle pain (PGP)
- Slipped capital femoral epiphysis
- Tarsal tunnel syndrome (TTS)
- Trauma

== See also ==
- Limp
