= Tobler's hiking function =

Formula for estimating hiking speed

Tobler's hiking function – walking speed vs. slope angle chart.

Tobler's hiking function is an exponential function determining the hiking speed, taking into account the slope angle. It was formulated by Waldo Tobler. This function was estimated from empirical data of the Swiss cartography professor Eduard Imhof.

== Formula ==
Walking velocity:

$$W=6e^{\displaystyle-3.5\left\vert\frac{dh}{dx}+0.05\right\vert}$$

$$\frac{dh}{dx}=S=\tan\theta$$

where

W = walking velocity [km/h]
dh = elevation difference,
dx = distance,
S = slope,
θ = angle of slope (inclination).

The velocity on the flat terrain is 5 km / h, the maximum speed of 6 km / h is achieved roughly at -2.86°.

On flat terrain this formula works out to 5 km/h. For off-path travel, this value should be multiplied by 3/5, for horseback by 5/4.

== Pace ==
Pace is the reciprocal of speed. For Tobler's hiking function it can be calculated from the following conversion:

$$p=0.6e^{\displaystyle3.5\left\vert m+0.05\right\vert}$$

where

p = pace [s/m]
m = gradient uphill or downhill (dh/dx = S in Tobler's formula),

== Sample values ==
Pace in minutes per kilometer or mile vs. slope angle for Tobler's hiking function.

Slope (deg)	Gradient (dh/dx)	Speed		Pace		
Slope (deg)	Gradient (dh/dx)	km / h	mi / h	min / km	min / mi	s / m
-60	-1.73	0.02	0.01	3603.9	5799.9	216.23
-50	-1.19	0.11	0.07	543.9	875.3	32.63
-40	-0.84	0.38	0.24	158.3	254.7	9.50
-30	-0.58	0.95	0.59	63.3	101.9	3.80
-25	-0.47	1.40	0.87	42.9	69.1	2.58
-20	-0.36	2.00	1.24	30.0	48.3	1.80
-15	-0.27	2.80	1.74	21.4	34.5	1.29
-10	-0.18	3.86	2.40	15.6	25.0	0.93
-5	-0.09	5.26	3.27	11.4	18.3	0.68
-2.8624	-0.05	6.00	3.73	10.0	16.1	0.60
0	0	5.04	3.13	11.9	19.2	0.71
1	0.02	4.74	2.94	12.7	20.4	0.76
5	0.09	3.71	2.30	16.2	26.0	0.97
10	0.18	2.72	1.69	22.1	35.5	1.32
15	0.27	1.97	1.23	30.4	49.0	1.83
20	0.36	1.41	0.88	42.6	68.5	2.56
25	0.47	0.98	0.61	60.9	98.1	3.66
30	0.58	0.67	0.41	89.9	144.6	5.39
40	0.84	0.27	0.17	224.6	361.5	13.48
50	1.19	0.08	0.05	771.8	1242.1	46.31

== See also ==
- Naismith's rule
- Preferred walking speed
- Tobler hyperelliptical projection
- Tobler's first law of geography
- Tobler's second law of geography
- Waldo Tobler bibliography
