= Murdoch Books =

Australian publisher

- Parent company: Allen & Unwin
- Founded: Early 1990s
- Founder: Matt Handbury
- Country of origin: Australia
- Headquarters location: Sydney
- Publication types: illustrated books
- Official website: www.murdochbooks.com.au

Murdoch Books is an Australian publisher, mainly of gardening and cook books. It was founded in the early 1990s.

The company had its beginnings when The Advertiser of Adelaide started printing magazines. Advertiser Magazines was renamed Murdoch Magazines in 1988. It published Australian editions of magazines Better Homes and Gardens and Family Circle.

Matt Handbury, a nephew of Rupert Murdoch, ran the company from 1987 and in 1989 launched New Woman. He purchased Murdoch Magazines in 1991. Over the years the company grew and became a very well-respected, albeit small player, in the highly competitive magazine market, and regarding securing its share of the advertising dollar, "punched well above its weight".

The company philosophy was "our purpose is to develop the most highly involved readers and to convince advertisers of the extraordinary and untapped benefit that involvement delivers".

The launch of Marie Claire in 1995 was a major success, and the title continues that success today (now owned by ARE Media). Men's Health was another successful title.

There were a few magazines that came and went quite quickly; Savvy, in 1990, only lasted 3 issues. Live This in 2000 shared a similar fate. Marie Claire Lifestyle lasted longer but ultimately was closed as well.

Murdoch Magazines was sold to Pacific Magazines in 2004. Murdoch Books began as a subsidiary of Murdoch Magazines.

In 2012 Murdoch Books was acquired by Allen & Unwin. Imprints include Pier 9, which features titles in the fields of fiction, memoir, biography and history.
