= Gait Abnormality Rating Scale =

- Purpose: evaluate individuals who are a risk to fall

Gait Abnormality Rating Scale (GARS) is a videotape-based analysis of 16 facets of human gait. It has been evaluated as a screening tool to identify patients at risk for injury from falls. and has been used in remote gait evaluation. A modified version was published in 1996.

== Scoring and assessment ==
The scale comprises three categories:

- five general facets
- four lower extremity facets
- seven trunk, head and upper extremity facets

Each item has a score range from 0 (good function) to 3 (poor function).

The total GARS score is the sum of the 16 individual facets, and the total score represents a rank ordering of risk for falling, based on the number of gait abnormalities recognized and the severity of any gait abnormality identified.
