= Gilbertfield House School =

Scottish school, in Hamilton, Lanarkshire

Gilbertfield House School was an academy at Hamilton, Lanarkshire, which between 1863 and 1878 prepared boys for entrance to universities, the Civil Service and commerce. Among its pupils were the statesman Bonar Law, the philosopher John Henry Muirhead and the sons of David Livingstone.

== Foundation and character ==
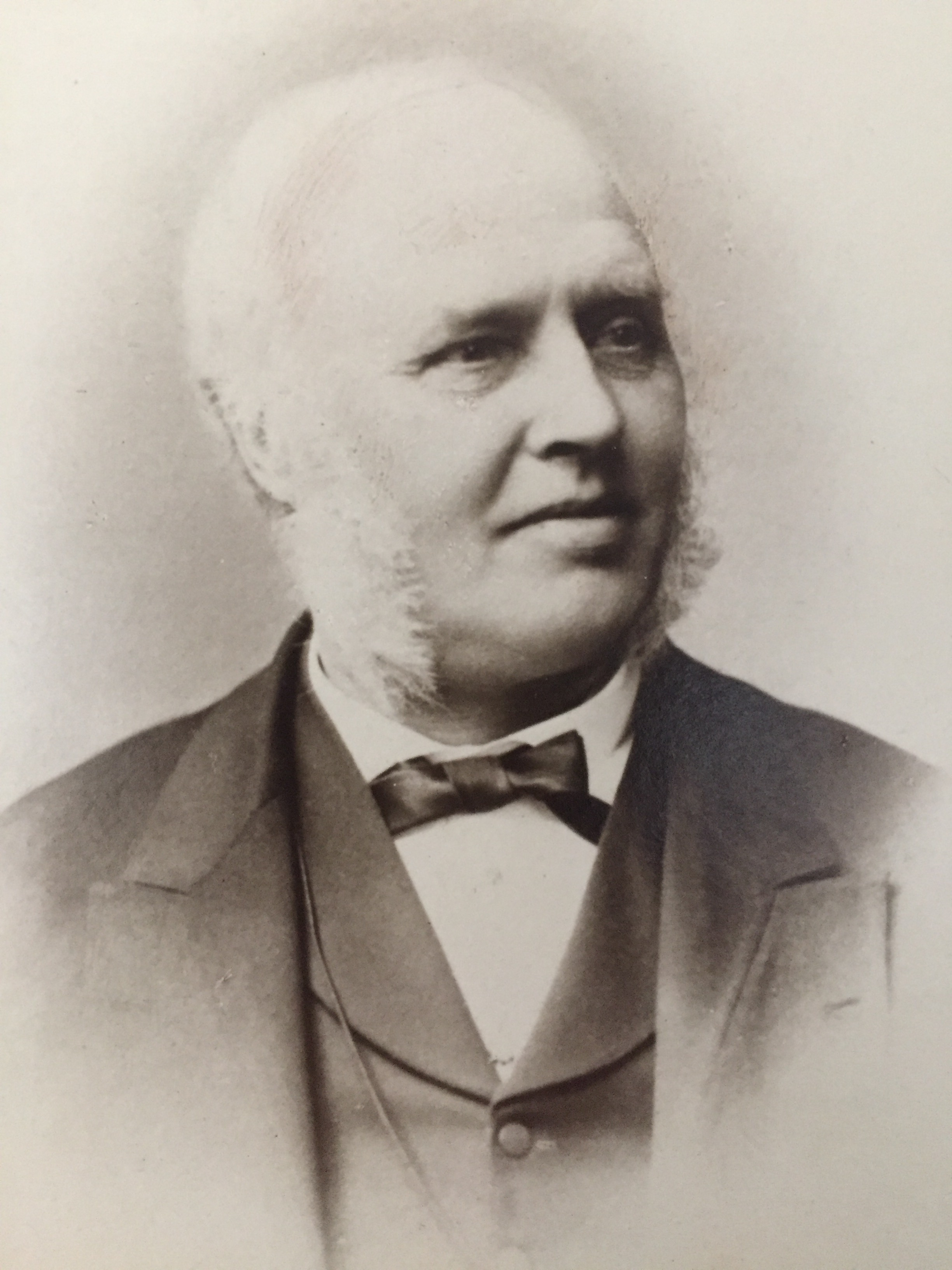
John Adams, founder of Gilbertfield House School.

Gilbertfield was established in 1863 at the private initiative of John Adams “to supply a want hitherto felt in Hamilton and its neighbourhood” and occupied premises which he had recently bought and enlarged on High Patrick Street. He conducted this fee-paying establishment in tandem with his headmastership of St John’s Grammar School, a Free Church foundation in Hamilton with over 400 pupils. Many of his private students had previously attended St John’s and proceeded to Gilbertfield for higher education, but he also attracted (and offered boarding for) boys from families based further afield including continental Europe, India and the Caribbean. Pupils were generally between the ages of 12 and 15 years. Their number was never large: in the 1872-3 session the total was 54.

The school was advertised as an “English and Classical School” and an “Establishment for the Board and Education of Young Gentlemen” where “pupils are prepared for the Universities, the Civil Service Examinations, and Commercial Pursuits”. From the outset it had English, Classics, Modern Languages (“French and German read and spoken daily”), Mathematics, and Writing Departments, taught painting and drawing, and provided instruction in dancing, deportment, gymnastics and fencing. Drill, under ex-army instructors, was an important element of the school regime.

Some of the school’s masters were resident, and others visited regularly; most were graduates or held institutional qualifications. John Adams himself was an Edinburgh University prizeman who had been on the teaching staff at Moray House. He kept abreast of best practice in education, regularly visiting the leading teaching colleges and major public schools in England and Scotland. He was a first cousin of the missionary-educationalist John Fordyce, whose two sons were pupils at Gilbertfield at the same time as Adams’ elder boy.

== History ==
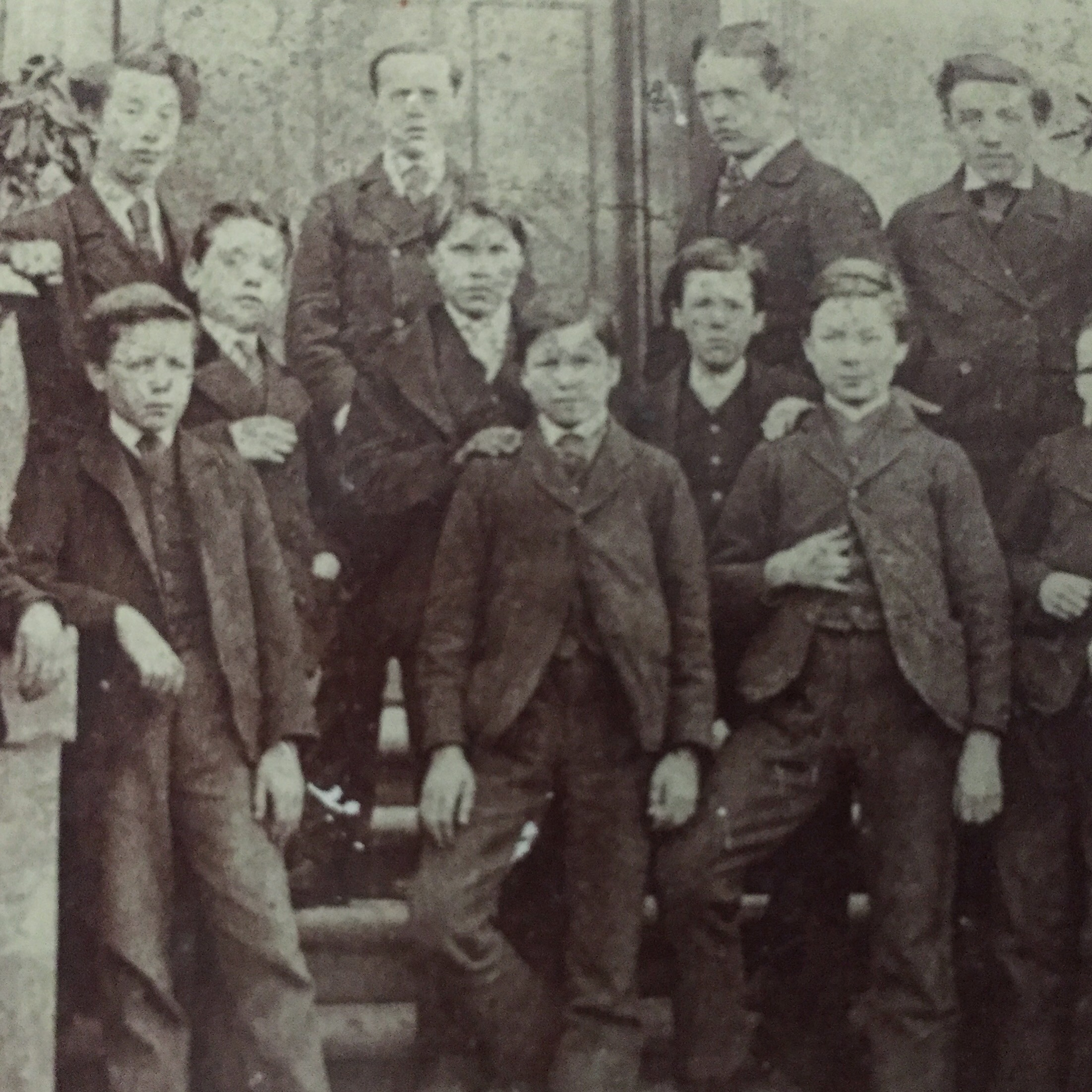
A photograph of pupils at Gilbertfield House School, 1873. Bonar Law appears in the middle row, second from left.

Early examination success for the school came when its pupils John Mackintosh and John Wallace Kidston were placed high in the Edinburgh University Local Examinations of 1865. Kidston and his brother William Hamilton Kidston were cousins of Bonar Law, and the quality of education they received at Gilbertfield resulted in Bonar Law being placed there in 1871. He won prizes for Greek and English in 1873, and Adams recorded him as being “a boy of great mental power”. Law’s fellow prizeman in Greek in 1873 was William Lewis Robertson, who served as General Secretary of the Presbyterian Church in England, 1918–30, and was its Moderator in 1931.

Among other siblings who attended Gilbertfield were John Henry Muirhead and his three gifted brothers and David Livingstone’s sons Thomas, who captained the school’s cricket eleven, and Oswell, who won numerous academic prizes. Livingstone himself was present at the school’s 1865 prize-giving when he addressed the pupils, telling them to “Fear God, and Work Hard”. This was his last public speech in Scotland, credited by Frederick Stanley Arnot as the inspiration for his own missionary work in Africa.

By the early 1870s, particular emphasis was given at Gilbertfield to the teaching of Classics and arrangements were in hand for awarding annual Classics scholarships at examinations to be overseen by Glasgow University professors. In 1872 it was reported that “owing to the school’s increasing prosperity, large additions have been made to the schoolrooms, which are now more than ever admirable in their internal arrangements, perfect in ventilation”. But in 1874, against the background of the Hamilton School Board proposing to make Hamilton Academy the “Higher Class School” of the Burgh under the 1872 Education Act, Adams elected to withdraw from his role at Gilbertfield and transferred the conduct of the school to William Wood, formerly of Dollar Academy. Wood ran the school from the Gilbertfield House premises for four years.

== Closure ==
In 1878 Wood removed the school to premises in Douglas Street, Hamilton, where he was joined by D. G. Kinmond, also formerly of Dollar Academy, and as joint-headmasters they styled this new establishment “Clydesdale College (formerly Gilbertfield House School)”. In the following year Wood left Hamilton to keep a School for Young Ladies in London, and by 1887 Clydesdale College had closed and Kinmond was teaching at Circus Place School in Edinburgh.

== Notable alumni ==
- Rev. Esslemont Adams, DSO, MC, DD (1864-1935), Presbyterian minister and army chaplain
- Boston Elphinstone Fordyce, MB (1858-1934), physician active in professional and local government representation
- Rev. James Hunter (1851-1916), Presbyterian minister and antiquary, author of Fala and Soutra (1892)
- Sir Henry Shanks Keith, GBE (1852-1944), civic administrator and educationalist
- William Hamilton Kidston (1852-1940), international rugby union player
- Bonar Law (1858-1923), United Kingdom prime minister, 1922–23
- William Oswell Livingstone, MB, CM (1851–89), physician, and member of the Royal Geographical Society team which searched for his missing father, David Livingstone, in 1872
- John Mackintosh, otherwise McIntosh (1850–70), first Red Cross volunteer to die on active service
- Islay Burns Muirhead, MD (1854-1948), physician and author of medical studies
- James Muirhead (1851- ?), lawyer and legislative draftsman
- John Henry Muirhead, LLD (1855-1940), philosopher
- Rev. Lewis Andrew Muirhead, DD (1857-1927), Presbyterian minister and author of theological works
- William Wilson Naismith (1856-1935), mountaineer
- Col. Thomas Ramsay (1854- ?), soldier
- Rev. William Lewis Robertson, DD (1860-1947), Presbyterian Church Moderator
- James Torrance (1859-1916), artist.
