= Gait (human) =

Pattern of limb movements made during locomotion

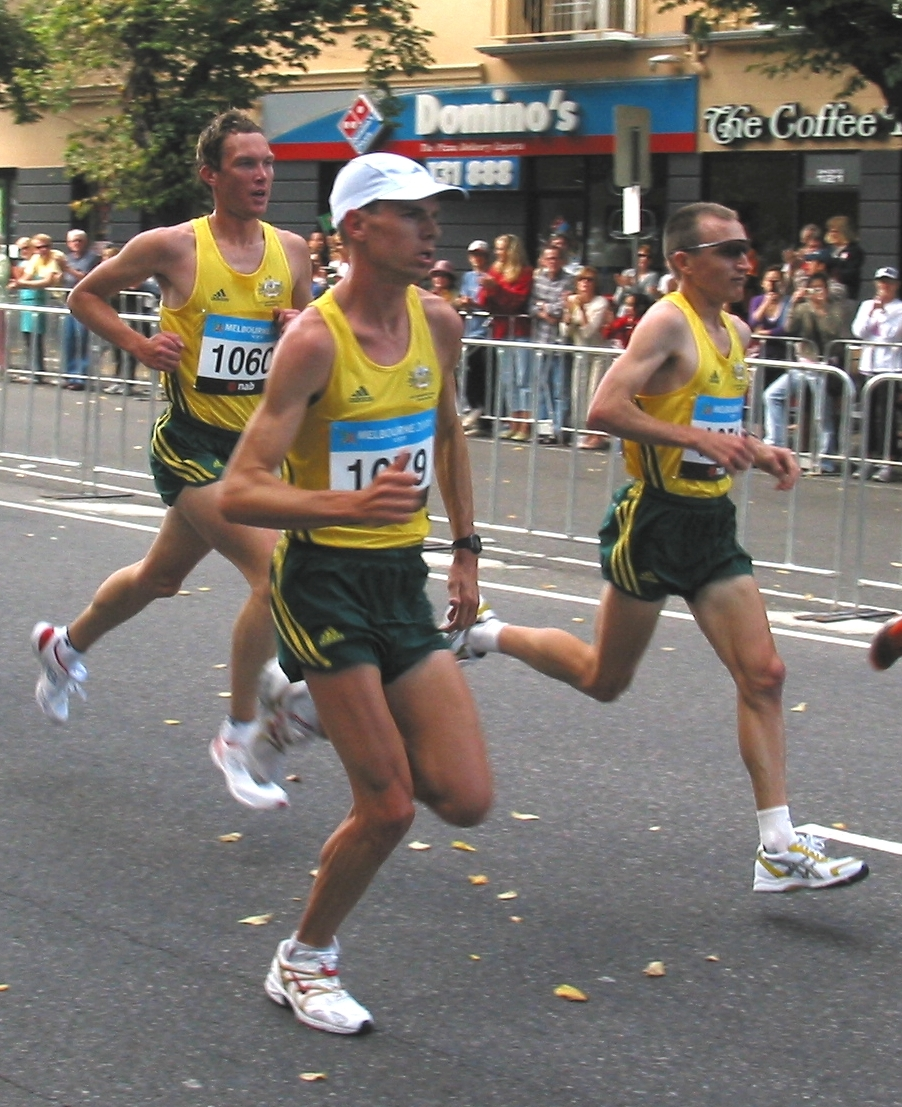
Humans using a running gait. The runner in the back and on the far right are in the suspended phase, in which neither foot touches the ground.

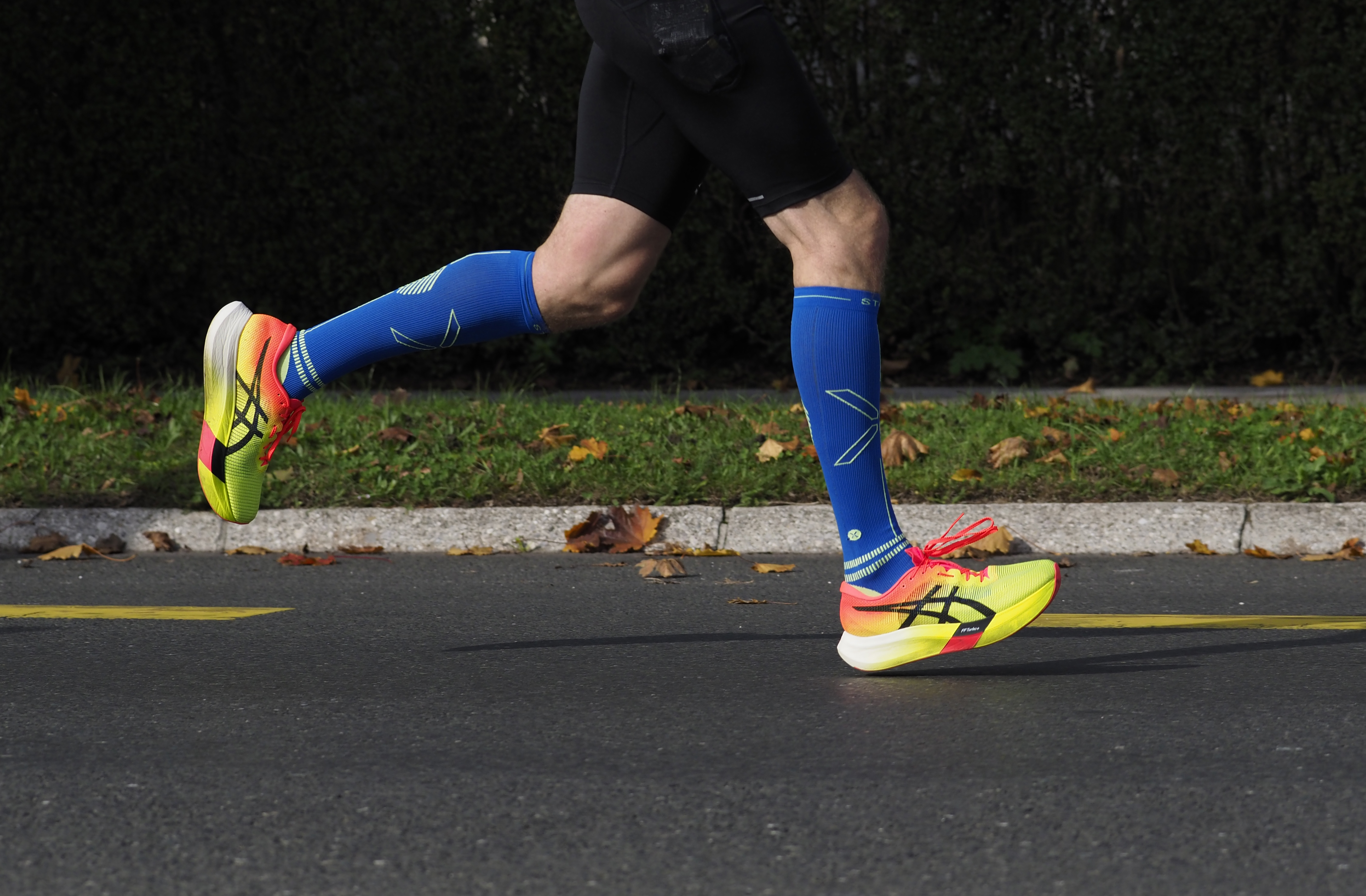
Rear-foot strike also known as "heel strike"

A gait is a manner of limb movements made during locomotion. Human gaits are the various ways in which humans can move, either naturally or as a result of specialized training. Human gait is defined as bipedal forward propulsion of the center of gravity of the human body, in which there are sinuous movements of different segments of the body with little energy spent. Various gaits are characterized by differences in limb movement patterns, overall velocity, forces, kinetic and potential energy cycles, and changes in contact with the ground.

== Classification ==
Human gaits are classified in various ways. Each gait can be generally categorized as either natural (one that humans use instinctively) or trained (a non-instinctive gait learned via training). Examples of the latter include hand walking and specialized gaits used in martial arts. Gaits can also be categorized according to whether the person remains in continuous contact with the ground.

== Foot strike ==
One variable in gait is foot strike – which part of the foot connects with the ground first.

- forefoot strike – toe-heel: ball of foot lands first
- mid-foot strike – heel and ball land simultaneously
- heel strike – heel-toe: heel of foot lands, then plantar flexes to ball

Sprinting typically features a forefoot strike, but the heel does not usually contact the ground.

Some researchers classify foot strike by the initial center of pressure; this is mostly applicable to shod running (running while wearing shoes). In this classification:

- a forefoot strike has the initial center of pressure in the front one-third of shoe length;
- a mid-foot strike is in the middle third;
- a rear-foot strike (heel strike) is in the rear third.

Foot strike varies between types of strides. It changes significantly and notably between walking and running, and between wearing shoes (shod) and not wearing shoes (barefoot).

Typically, barefoot walking features heel or mid-foot strikes, while barefoot running features mid-foot or forefoot strikes. Barefoot running rarely features heel strikes because the impact can be painful, the human heel pad not absorbing much of the force of impact. By contrast, 75% of runners wearing modern running shoes use heel strikes; running shoes are characterized by a padded sole, stiff soles and arch support, and slope down from a more-padded heel to a less-padded forefoot.

The cause of this change in gait in shoe running is unknown, but Lieberman noted that there is correlation between the foot-landing style and exposure to shoes. In some individuals the gait pattern is largely unchanged (the leg and foot positions are identical in barefoot and shoes), but the wedge shape of the padding moves the point of impact back from the forefoot to the mid-foot. In other cases it is believed that the padding of the heel softens the impact. This results in runners modifying their gait to move the point of contact further back in the foot.

A 2012 study involving Harvard University runners found that those who "habitually rear-foot strike had approximately twice the rate of repetitive stress injuries than individuals who habitually forefoot strike." This was the first study to investigate the link between foot strike and injury rates. However, earlier studies have shown that smaller collision forces were generated when running forefoot strike compared to rear-foot strike. This may protect the ankle joints and lower limbs from some of the impact-related injuries experienced by rear-foot strikers.

In a 2017 article called "Foot Strike Pattern in Children During Shod-Unshod Running", over 700 children aged 6 to 16 were observed using multiple video recording devices in order to study their foot strike patterns and neutral support. Rear foot strike was most common, in both shod and unshod running, and in both boys and girls. There was a significant reduction in rear foot strike from shod to unshod: boys shod - 83.95% RFS, boys unshod - 62.65% RFS; girls shod - 87.85% RFS, girls unshod - 62.70% RFS.

As of 2021, there was a very low level of evidence to suggest a relationship between foot strike pattern and runner injury. Studies used retrospective designs, low sample size and potentially inaccurate self-reporting.

== Control of gait by the nervous system ==
The central nervous system regulates gait in a highly ordered fashion through a combination of voluntary and automatic processes. The basic locomotor pattern is an automatic process that results from rhythmic reciprocal bursts of flexor and extensor activity. This rhythmic firing is the result of Central Pattern Generators (CPGs), which operate regardless of whether a motion is voluntary or not. CPGs do not require sensory input to be sustained. However, studies have identified that gait patterns in deafferented or immobilized animals are more simplistic than in neurologically intact animals. (Deafferentation and immobilization are experimental preparations of animals to study neural control. Deafferentation involves transecting the dorsal roots of the spinal cord that innervate the animal's limbs, which impedes transmission of sensory information while keeping motor innervation of muscles intact. In contrast, immobilization involves injecting an acetylcholine inhibitor, which impedes the transmission of motor signals while sensory input is unaffected.)

The complexity of gait arises from the need to adapt to expected and unexpected changes in the environment (e.g., changes in walking surface or obstacles). Visual, vestibular, proprioceptive, and tactile sensory information provides important feedback related to gait and permits the adjustment of a person's posture or foot placement depending on situational requirements. When approaching an obstacle, visual information about the size and location of the object is used to adapt the stepping pattern. These adjustments involve change in the trajectory of leg movement and the associated postural adjustments required to maintain their balance. Vestibular information provides information about position and movement of the head as the person moves through their environment. Proprioceptors in the joints and muscles provide information about joint position and changes in muscle length. Skin receptors, referred to as exteroceptors, provide additional tactile information about stimuli that a limb encounters.

Gait in humans is difficult to study due to ethical concerns. Therefore, the majority of what is known about gait regulation in humans is ascertained from studies involving other animals or is demonstrated in humans using functional magnetic resonance imaging during the mental imagery of gait. These studies have provided the field with several important discoveries.

=== Locomotor centers ===
There are three specific centers within the brain that regulate gait:

- Mesencephalic Locomotor Region (MLR)- Within the midbrain, the MLR receives input from the premotor cortex, the limbic system, cerebellum, hypothalamus, and other parts of the brainstem. These neurons connect to other neurons within the mesencephalic reticular formation which then descend via the ventrolateral funiculus to the spinal locomotor networks. Studies where the MLR of decerebrate cats have been stimulated either electrically or chemically have shown that increased intensity of stimulation has led to increased speed of stepping. Deep brain stimulation of the MLR in individuals with Parkinson's has also led to improvements in gait and posture.
- Sub thalamic Locomotor Region (SLR)- The SLR is part of the hypothalamus. It activates the spinal locomotor networks both directly and indirectly via the MLR.
- Cerebellar Locomotor Region (CLR)- Similar to the SLR, the CLR activates the reticulo-spinal locomotor pathway via direct and indirect projections.

These centers are coordinated with the posture control systems within the cerebral hemispheres and the cerebellum. With each behavioral movement, the sensory systems responsible for posture control respond. These signals act on the cerebral cortex, the cerebellum, and the brainstem. Many of these pathways are currently under investigation, but some aspects of this control are fairly well understood.

=== Regulation by the cerebral cortex ===
Sensory input from multiple areas of the cerebral cortex, such as the visual cortex, vestibular cortex, and the primary sensory cortex, is required for skilled locomotor tasks. This information is integrated and transmitted to the supplementary motor area (SMA) and premotor area of the cerebral cortex where motor programs are created for intentional limb movement and anticipatory postural adjustments. For example, the motor cortex uses visual information to increase the precision of stepping movements. When approaching an obstacle, an individual will make adjustments to their stepping pattern based on visual input regarding the size and location of the obstacle. The primary motor cortex is responsible for the voluntary control for the contralateral leg while the SMA is linked to postural control.

=== Regulation by the cerebellum ===
The cerebellum plays a major role in motor coordination, regulating voluntary and involuntary processes. Regulation of gait by the cerebellum is referred to as "error/correction", because the cerebellum responds to abnormalities in posture in order to coordinate proper movement. The cerebellum is thought to receive sensory information (e.g. visual, vestibular) about actual stepping patterns as they occur and compare them to the intended stepping pattern. When there is a discrepancy between these two signals, the cerebellum determines the appropriate correction and relays this information to the brainstem and motor cortex. Cerebellar output to the brainstem is thought to be specifically related to postural muscle tone while output to the motor cortex is related to cognitive and motor programming processes. The cerebellum sends signals to the cerebral cortex and the brain stem in response to sensory signals received from the spinal cord. Efferent signals from these regions go to the spinal cord where motor neurons are activated to regulate gait. This information is used to regulate balance during stepping and integrates information about limb movement in space, as well as head position and movement.

=== Regulation by the spinal cord ===
Spinal reflexes not only generate the rhythm of locomotion through CPGs but also ensure postural stability during gait. There are multiple pathways within the spinal cord which play a role in regulating gait, including the role of reciprocal inhibition and stretch reflexes to produce alternating stepping patterns. A stretch reflex occurs when a muscle is stretched and then contracts protectively while opposing muscle groups relax. An example of this during gait occurs when the weight-bearing leg nears the end of the stance phase. At this point the hip extends and the hip flexors are elongated. Muscle spindles within the hip flexors detect this stretch and trigger muscle contraction of the hip flexors required for the initiation of the swing phase of gait. However, Golgi tendon organs in the extensor muscles also send signals related to the amount of weight being supported through the stance leg to ensure that limb flexion does not occur until the leg is adequately unweighted and the majority of weight has been transferred to the opposite leg. Information from the spinal cord is transmitted for higher-order processing to supraspinal structures via spinothalamic, spinoreticular, and spinocerebellar tracts.

== Natural gaits ==
The so-called natural gaits, in increasing order of speed, are the walk, jog, skip, run, and sprint. While other intermediate-speed gaits may occur naturally to some people, these five basic gaits occur naturally across almost all cultures. All natural gaits are designed to propel a person forward but can also be adapted for lateral movement. As natural gaits all have the same purpose; they are mostly distinguished by when the leg muscles are used during the gait cycle.

=== Walk ===
Walking involves having at least one foot in contact with the ground at all times. There is also a period of time within the gait cycle where both feet are simultaneously in contact with the ground. When a foot is lifted off the ground, that limb is in the "swing phase" of gait. When a foot is in contact with the ground, that limb is in the "stance phase" of gait. A mature walking pattern is characterized by the gait cycle being approximately 60% stance phase, 40% swing phase. Initiation of gait is a voluntary process that involves a preparatory postural adjustment where the center of mass is moved forward and laterally prior to unweighting one leg. The center of mass is only within a person's base of support when both feet are in contact with the ground (known as double limb stance). When only one foot is in contact with the ground (single limb stance), the center of mass is in front of that foot and moving towards the leg that is in the swing phase.

=== Skip ===
Skipping is a gait children display when they are about four to five years old. While a jog is similar to a horse's trot, the skip is closer to the bipedal equivalent of a horse's canter. In order to investigate the gait strategies likely to be favored at low gravity, a study by Ackermann and Van Den Bogert ran a series of predictive, computational simulations of gait using a physiological model of the musculoskeletal system, without assuming any particular type of gait. They used a computationally efficient optimization strategy, allowing for multiple simulations. Their results reveal skipping as more efficient and less fatiguing than walking or running and suggest the existence of a walk-skip rather than a walk-run transition at low gravity.

== Gait patterns in children ==
Time and distance parameters of gait patterns are dependent on a child's age. Different age leads to different step speed and timing. Arm swinging slows when the speed of walking is increased. The height of a child plays a significant role in stride distance and speed. The taller the child is the longer the stride will be and the further the step will be. Gait patterns are velocity and age dependent. For example, as age increases so does velocity. Meanwhile, as age increases, the cadence (rate at which someone walks that is measured in steps per minute) of the gait pattern decreases. Physical attributes such as height, weight, and even head circumference can also play a role in gait patterns in children. Environmental and emotional status also play a role in with speed, velocity, and gait patterns that a child uses. Besides, children of different genders will have different rates of gait development. Significant developmental changes in gait parameters such as stride time, swing time, and cadence occur in a child's gait two months after the onset of independent walking, possibly due to an increase in postural control at this point of development.

By the age of three, most children have mastered the basic principles of walking, consistent with that of adults. Age is not the only deciding factor in gait development. Gender differences have been seen in young children as early as three years old. Girls tend to have a more stable gait than boys between the ages of 3–6 years old. Another difference includes the plantar contact area. Girls showed a smaller contact area in plantar loading patterns than boys in children with healthy feet.

== Sex differences ==
There are sex differences in human gait patterns: females tend to walk with smaller step width and more pelvic movement. Gait analysis generally takes biological sex into consideration. Sex differences in human gait can be explored using a demonstration created by the BioMotion Laboratory at York University in Toronto.

== Efficiency and evolutionary implications ==
Even though plantigrade locomotion usually distributes more weight toward the end of the limb than digitigrade locomotion, which increases energy expenditure in most systems, studies have shown that humans are economical walkers, but not economical runners, which is said to be consistent with evolutionary specialization for both economical walking and endurance running.

For the same distance, walking with a natural heel-first gait burns roughly 70% less energy than running. Differences of this magnitude are unusual in mammals. Kathyrn Knight of the Journal of Experimental Biology summarizes the findings of one study: "Landing heel first also allows us to transfer more energy from one step to the next to improve our efficiency, while placing the foot flat on the ground reduces the forces around the ankle (generated by the ground pushing against us), which our muscles have to counteract." According to David Carrier of the University of Utah, who helped perform the study, "Given the great distances hunter-gatherers travel, it is not surprising that humans are economical walkers."

== Key determinants of gait ==
A normal gait pattern depends on a range of biomechanical features, controlled by the nervous system for increased energy conservation and balance. These biomechanical features of normal gait have been defined as key determinants of gait. It is therefore necessary for the refined neurological control and integration of these gait features for accuracy and precision with less energy expenditure. As a result, any abnormality of the neuro-musculo-skeletal system may lead to abnormality in gait and increased energy expenditure.

The six kinematics or determinants of gait, described below, were introduced by Saunders et al. in 1953, and have been widely embraced with various refinements. Recent studies have suggested that the first three determinants might contribute less to reducing the vertical displacement of the center of mass (COM).

These determinants of gait are known to ensure economical locomotion, by the reduction in vertical center of mass (COM) excursion leading to reduction in metabolic energy. It is therefore suggested that the precise control of these determinants of gait leads to increased energy conservation. These kinematic features of gait are integrated or coordinated in order to ensure a circular arc trajectory of the COM, as theory proposed as the 'compass gait (straight knee)'. The theory underlying the determinants run contrary to that of the 'inverted pendulum' theory with a static stance leg acting as a pendulum that prescribes an arc. The six determinants of gaits and their effects on COM displacement and energy conservation are described below in chronological order:

1. Pelvic rotation: This kinematic feature of gait operates under the theory of compass gait model. In this model, the pelvis rotates side to side during normal gait. In effect, it aids in the progression of the contralateral side through reduced hip flexion and extension. Its effect on the reduction of metabolic energy and the increased energy conservation is through the reduction of vertical COM displacement. This notion of reduction of metabolic cost may be disputed by a study done by Gard and Childress (1997), who stated that there may be minimal effect of pelvic rotation on vertical COM displacement. Furthermore, other studies have found pelvic rotation to have little effect on the smoothing of COM trajectory. Pelvic rotation has been shown to account for about 12% reduction in the total COM vertical displacement.
2. Pelvic tilt/Obliquity: Normal gait results in tilting of the swing phase side, in relation to the control by the stance side hip abductors. As a consequence, there is the neutralization of raising of COM during the transition from hip flexion to extension. Its effect on the reduction of metabolic energy and the increased energy conservation is via the reduction of vertical COM trajectory or peak form compass gait model. Pelvic obliquity's effects on reduction of vertical displacement of COM has been examined and been shown to only reduce vertical displacement of COM by at most, only 2–4 mm.
3. Knee flexion at stance phase: The knee usually supports the body weight in flexed position during walking. The knee is usually fully extended at heel strike and then begins to flex (average magnitude of 15 degrees) when foot is completely flat on the ground. The effects of the stance-phase knee flexion is to lower the apex of vertical trajectory of the COM via shortening of the leg resulting in some energy conservation. But recent studies testing this third determinant of gait have reported varied results. It was found out that stance-phase knee flexion did not contribute to the reduction in vertical trajectory of COM. Furthermore, Gard and Childress (1997) indicated that maximum COM is reached at mid-stance when knee is slightly flexed, depicting minor reduction of the maximum height of the COM by a few millimeters.
4. Foot and ankle motions: Saunders et al. showed relationship between angular displacement and motions of foot, ankle and knee. This results in two intersecting arcs of rotation at the foot during stance phase at heel contact and heel rise. At heel contact the COM reaches its lowest point of downward displacement when the foot is dorsiflexed, and the knee joint fully extended in order for the extremity to be at its maximum length. The ankle rockers at heel strike and mid-stance leads to decrease COM displacement through the shortening of the leg. Studies by Kerrigan et al. (2001) and Gard & Childress (1997) have shown the major role played by heel rise in reducing the COM vertical displacement.
5. Knee motion: The motion of the knee is related to those of the ankle and foot motions and results in the reduction of COM vertical displacement. Therefore, an immobile knee or ankle could lead to increases in COM displacement and energy cost.
6. Lateral pelvic displacement: In this key gait feature, the displacement of the COM is realized by the lateral shift of the pelvis or by relative adduction of the hip. Correction of disproportionate lateral displacement of the pelvis is mediated by the effect of tibiofemoral angle, and relative adduction of the hip, which results in reduction in vertical COM displacement. It is clear that these kinematic features play a critical role in ensuring efficiency in normal gait. But there may be the need for further extensive testing or validation of each of the key determinants of gait.

== Abnormal gaits ==
Abnormal gait is a result of one or more of these tracts being disturbed. This can happen developmentally or as the result of neurodegeneration. The most prominent example of gait irregularities due to developmental differences comes from studies of children on the autism spectrum. In general, they tend to have decreased muscle coordination, thus usually resulting in abnormalities in gait. Some of this is associated with decreased muscle tone, also known as hypotonia, which is also common in ASD. The most prominent example of abnormal gait as a result of neurodegeneration is Parkinson's.

Although these are the best understood examples of abnormal gait, there are other phenomena that are described in the medical field.

- Antalgic gait: limping caused by pain that appears or worsens when bearing weight on one limb, due to injury, disease, or other painful conditions
- Charlie Chaplin gait: occurs in tibial torsion.
- Circumduction gait: occurs in hemiplegia
- Waddling gait: occurs in bilateral congenital hip dislocation
- High stepping gait: occurs in foot drop
- Scissor gait: occurs in cerebral palsy
- Stiff hip gait: occurs in ankylosis of the hip
- Trendelenburg gait: occurs in unstable hip due to congenital dislocation of hip, gluteus medius muscle weakness

Abnormal gait can also be a result of a stroke. However, by using treadmill therapy to activate the cerebellum, abnormalities in gait can be improved.

== Literary references ==
The author of the Deuterocanonical Book of Sirach observes that "a man's attire, and excessive laughter, and gait, shew what he is". Biblical writer J. J. Collins suggests that this verse quotes a traditional maxim.

== See also ==
- Astasia abasia
- Contrapposto
- Effect of gait parameters on energetic cost
- Gait abnormality
- Gait Abnormality Rating Scale
- Gait analysis
- Human positions
- Marche a petit pas
- Power walking
- Soft biometrics
- Terrestrial locomotion in animals
