= Skipping (gait) =

Rhythmic form of bipedal locomotion

Skipping is a rhythmic form of bipedal locomotion that combines the step and hop. Skipping can be performed bilaterally (alternating lead foot) or unilaterally (continual lead foot). Unlike walking or running, skipping is an asymmetrical movement in which successive footfalls are not evenly spaced in time. The gait is unique in that it has the sustained flight phase found in running and the double support phase found in walking. Skipping is most commonly used by children of around 4.5 years of age. It is unclear why the gait is adopted in early years. Skipping is 150% more metabolically demanding than running performed at the same speed.

== Unilateral ==
Astronaut Gene Cernan unilaterally skipping on the moon before falling

In unilateral skipping or bipedal galloping, one foot will always be ahead of the other. To perform the unilateral skip, take a step with the desired lead foot, hop forward on the same foot, land with the backfoot, and repeat. Unilateral skipping is commonly used by humans while descending stairs or maneuvering sharp turns. Astronauts Ed Mitchell and Gene Cernan of the Apollo 14 and 17 missions respectively, both preferred the use of unilateral skipping as a means of traversing the surface of the moon. In lunar gravity conditions, the differences in metabolic consumption rates between running and skipping become marginal.

== Bilateral ==
In bilateral skipping, the lead foot is continuously alternating. To perform the bilateral skip, take a step with the desired lead foot, hop forward on the same foot, land with the same foot, swing the back foot ahead of the lead foot, and repeat with the new lead foot.

== Exercise ==
Power skipping is a plyometric exercise used to increase athletic explosiveness. It can be performed unilaterally or bilaterally with the latter being the more common use case. As the name suggests, power skipping is meant to be a more powerful version of skipping that involves thrusting oneself forcefully off of one foot into the air.

Skipping can also be used as an alternative to running or walking. Skipping is more efficient at burning calories than running. It is recommended that skipping not be performed on a treadmill. As a chronologically asymmetric movement, the constant speed of the treadmill poses a risk for injury.

== Benefits ==
The presence of a double support phase in skipping (not present in running) results in lower forces applied to the knee joint, making it a good cardiovascular exercise for those with knee pain.
