= Naismith's rule =

Rule of thumb for hiking time

Naismith's rule

Naismith's rule helps with the planning of a walking or hiking expedition by calculating how long it will take to travel the intended route, including any extra time taken when walking uphill. This rule of thumb was devised by William W. Naismith, a Scottish mountaineer, in 1892 whilst walking Cruach Ardrain. A modern version can be formulated as follows:

Allow one hour for every 3 miles (5 km) forward, plus an additional hour for every 2,000 feet (600 m) of ascent.

== Assumptions and calculations ==
Pace in minutes per kilometre or mile vs. slope angle resulting from Naismith's rule for basal speeds of 5 km/h and 4 km/h. (Note: Speed and pace for the Naismith rule were calculated here for its metric version (5 kilometres horizontally and 600 meters of ascent), not the original one (3 mi and 2,000 ft). In case of Naismith rule and Langmuir corrections the same, not modified value of ascent and descent was used for the distance of 4 km as for 5 km – 600 m for the Naismith rule and 300 m for Langmuir corrections (not taking into account the equivalence between distance and climb).)

The original Naismith's rule from 1892 says that one should allow one hour per three miles on the map and an additional hour per 2000 feet of ascent. It is included in the last sentence of his report from a trip.

Today it is formulated in many ways. Naismith's 1 h / 3 mi + 1 h / 2000 ft can be replaced by:

- 1 h / 3 mi (5 km) + 1 h / 2000 ft (600 m)
- 1 h / 5 km (3 mi) + 1/2 h / 300 m (1000 ft)
- 3 mph + ½ h / 1000 ft
  5 km/h + ½ h / 300 m (Note: Langmuir 2013 recalls the Naismith's rule from 1892 in miles and feet, but further gives and uses it in metric system, climbing sometimes per contour line on a map (10 m or 50 m).)
- 12 min / 1 km + 10 min / 100 m

The basic rule assumes hikers of reasonable fitness, on typical terrain, and under normal conditions. It does not account for delays, such as extended breaks for rest or sightseeing, or for navigational obstacles. For planning expeditions a team leader may use Naismith's rule in putting together a route card.

It is possible to apply adjustments or "corrections" for more challenging terrain, although it cannot be used for scrambling routes. In the grading system used in North America, Naismith's rule applies only to hikes rated Class 1 on the Yosemite Decimal System, and not to Class 2 or higher.

In practice, the results of Naismith's rule are usually considered the minimum time necessary to complete a route, though modern adaptations and hiking time calculators account for terrain difficulty, elevation gain, and individual fitness levels.

When walking in groups, Naismith’s rule is generally applied based on the pace of the slowest member to ensure the group remains together. This adjustment accounts for variations in fitness, terrain difficulty, and rest needs among participants.

Naismith's rule appears in UK statute law, although not by name. The Adventure Activities Licensing Regulations apply to providers of various activities including trekking. Part of the definition of trekking is that it is over terrain on which it would take more than 30 minutes to reach a road or refuge (by the quickest safe route), based on a walking speed of 5 kilometres per hour plus an additional minute for every 10 metres of ascent.

A plot of walking speed versus slope resulting from Naismith's rule and Langmuir corrections for base speeds of 5 km/h and 4 km/h compared to Tobler's hiking function.

== Scarf's equivalence between distance and climb ==
Alternatively, the rule can be used to determine the equivalent flat distance of a route. This is achieved by recognising that Naismith's rule implies an equivalence between distance and climb in time terms: 3 miles (=15,840 feet) of distance is equivalent in time terms to 2000 feet of climb.

Professor Philip Scarf, Associate Dean of Research and Innovation and Professor of Applied Statistics at the University of Salford, in research published in 2008, gives the following formula:

equivalent distance = x + α·y

where:

x = horizontal distance
y = vertical distance
α = 7.92 (3 mi / 2000 ft), called Naismith’s number by Scarf

That is, 7.92 units of distance are equivalent to 1 unit of climb. For convenience an 8 to 1 rule can be used. So, for example, if a route is 20 kilometres (12 mi) with 1600 metres of climb (as is the case on leg 1 of the Bob Graham Round, Keswick to Threlkeld), the equivalent flat distance of this route is 20+(1.6×8)=32.8 kilometres (20.4 mi). Assuming an individual can maintain a speed on the flat of 5 km/h, the route will take 6 hours and 34 minutes. The simplicity of this approach is that the time taken can be easily adjusted for an individual's own (chosen) speed on the flat; at 8 km/h (flat speed) the route will take 4 hours and 6 minutes. The rule has been tested on fell running times and found to be reliable. Scarf proposed this equivalence in 1998.

As you can see the forward, the Scarf's assumption allows also to calculate the time for each speed, not just one as in case of the original Naismith rule.

=== Pace ===
Pace is the reciprocal of speed. It can be calculated here from the following formula:

p = p0·(1 + α·m)

where:

p = pace
p0 = pace on flat terrain
m = gradient uphill

This formula is true for m≥0 (uphill or flat terrain). It assumes equivalence of distance and climb by applying mentioned earlier α factor.

Sample calculations: p0 = 12 min / km (for 5 km / h speed), m = 0.6 km climb / 5 km distance = 0.12, p = 12 · (1 + 7.92 · 0.12) = 23.4 min / km.

== Other modifications ==
Over the years several adjustments have been formulated in an attempt to make the rule more accurate by accounting for further variables such as load carried, roughness of terrain, descents and fitness (or lack of it). The accuracy of some corrections is disputed, in particular the speed at which walkers descend a gentle gradient. No simple formula can encompass the full diversity of mountain conditions and individual abilities.

=== Tranter's corrections ===
Tranter's corrections make adjustments for fitness and fatigue. Fitness is determined by the time it takes to climb 1000 feet over a distance of ½ mile (800 m). Additional adjustments for uneven or unstable terrain or conditions can be estimated by dropping one or more fitness levels.

Individual fitness in minutes	Time taken in hours estimated using Naismith's rule
Individual fitness in minutes	2	3	4	5	6	7	8	9	10	12	14	16	18	20	22	24
15 (very fit)	1	1.5	2	2.75	3.5	4.5	5.5	6.75	7.75	10	12.5	14.5	17	19.5	22	24
20	1.25	2.25	3.25	4.5	5.5	6.5	7.75	8.75	10	12.5	15	17.5	20	23
25	1.5	3	4.25	5.5	7	8.5	10	11.5	13.25	15	17.5
30	2	3.5	5	6.75	8.5	10.5	12.5	14.5
40	2.75	4.25	5.75	7.5	9.5	11.5			Too much to be attempted
50 (unfit)	3.25	4.75	6.5	8.5

For example, if Naismith's rule estimates a journey time of 9 hours and your fitness level is 25, you should allow 11.5 hours.

=== Aitken corrections ===
Aitken (1977) assumes that 1 h takes to cover 3 mi (5 km) on paths, tracks and roads, while this is reduced to 2½ mi (4 km) on all other surfaces.

For both distances he gives an additional 1 h per 2000 ft (600 m) of ascent. So Aitken doesn't take into account equivalence between distance and climb (proposed by Scarf in 1998).

=== Langmuir corrections ===
Langmuir (1984) extends the rule on descent. He assumes the Naismith's base speed of 5 km/h and makes the following further refinements for going downhill:

- For a gentle decline (slopes between 5 degrees and 12 degrees) subtract 10 minutes for every 300 meters of descent
- For a steep decline (slopes greater than 12 degrees) add 10 minutes for every 300 meters of descent

Later he says that the fitness of the slowest member of a party should be taken into account and thus a more practical formula for a group is:

- 4 km/h + 1 h / 450 m of ascent

== See also ==
- Preferred walking speed
- Tobler's hiking function
