= Coxalgia =

Pain in the hip

Coxalgia (/kok sáljə/), also known as coxodynia (/koks'ō-din'ē-ă/, from Latin coxa 'hip' and algia/odyne 'pain'), is defined as pain in the hip or disease-related pain of the hip. Coxalgia refers to general sensation of pain in the hip area, including the muscles surrounding the hip – sartorius, tensor fasciae latae, ilio-tibial banding and the sensation of the tissue surrounding bones. Coxalgia will have an underlying cause- in adults this is most commonly osteoarthritis, degeneration of hip joints or bursitis (inflammation of the bursae-fluid sacs) of the joints. Coxalgia may precede diagnosis or identification of other diseases by some considerable time as indicated for monitoring and review.

Coxalgia is a symptom of underlying hip joint pathology and must be examined and referred as the symptoms of pain and reduced mobility will increase and worsen, leading to chronic pain states. Coxalgia may be due to trauma, dysplasia and abnormal growth, degeneration, osteo-deficiencies of B12 or folate or metastasising cancer. Pain management should include robust use of pharmacological and non-pharmacological interventions.

== Diagnosis ==
Coxalgia may be identified by a physician through a hip joint exam, by observing antalgic gait and stance, reduced mobility and reduced tone, power and co-ordination through the normal expected range of hip joint motion.

== Treatment ==
Coxalgia may be treated in the short-term by over-the-counter pain relief such as paracetamol, aspirin or ibuprofen. Further pain management must be sought in co-ordination with a GP or healthcare specialist.

Diagnostic tools such as ultrasound, CT imaging and MRI to identify the extent of the underlying disease at which point referral to specialist general practitioner or orthopaedic surgeon should follow.

Complementary adjunct therapies such as physiotherapy, TENS trans-cutaneous electro-neuro- stimulation and bio-mechanical therapies may be useful in managing the reduced mobility and alleviating the pain.

Various aids are available for minimising the angles and strains of the hip joint and enabling peri-operative recovery. These include, modified toilet seats, cushions for optimum 'sitting angle' and aids for reaching and manoeuvring through the symptoms without causing harm.
