= Allen & Unwin =

Australian publishing company

- Founded: 1914 (United Kingdom); 1976 (Australian arm)
- Founder: Stanley Unwin
- Country of origin: United Kingdom
- Headquarters location: Crows Nest, New South Wales, Australia
- Distribution: United Book Distributors (Australia); Atlantic Books (UK adult); Murdoch Books (UK children's); Trafalgar Square Publishing (North America, China); APD Singapore (Singapore); Wild Dog Press (South Africa)
- Publication types: Books
- Imprints: Arena, Crows Nest, House of Books, Inspired Living, Murdoch Books, Pier 9
- Official website: www.allenandunwin.com

George Allen & Unwin is a British publishing company formed in 1914 after Sir Stanley Unwin purchased a controlling interest in George Allen & Co. It established an Australian subsidiary in 1976. In 1990 Allen & Unwin was sold to HarperCollins, and the Australian branch was the subject of a management buy-out.

== George Allen & Unwin in the UK ==
George Allen & Sons was established in 1871 by George Allen, with the backing of John Ruskin, becoming George Allen & Co. Ltd. in 1911 when it merged with Swan Sonnenschein and then George Allen & Unwin on 4 August 1914 as a result of Stanley Unwin's purchase of a controlling interest. Frank Arthur Mumby and Frances Helena Swan Stallybrass, Unwin's son Rayner S. Unwin and his nephew Philip helped him to run the company, which published works by Bertrand Russell, Arthur Waley, Roald Dahl, Lancelot Hogben and Thor Heyerdahl. It became well known as J. R. R. Tolkien's publisher some time after publishing the popular children's fantasy novel The Hobbit in 1937, and its high fantasy sequel The Lord of the Rings novel in 1954–1955. Book series published by the firm in this period included the Muirhead Library of Philosophy and Unwin Books, a paperback imprint.

Rayner Unwin retired at the end of 1985, and the firm was amalgamated in 1986 with Bell & Hyman to form Unwin Hyman Ltd., with Robin Hyman as chief executive. From this time "Allen & Unwin" continued only as the name of the Australian subsidiary of Unwin Hyman. Rayner Unwin returned for a while as part-time chairman of Unwin Hyman, retiring again at the end of 1988. It was over the objections of Rayner Unwin, the largest shareholder, that in 1990 Hyman sold the firm to HarperCollins. HarperCollins has since sold Unwin Hyman's academic book list to Routledge.

== Unwin Books ==
When Allen & Unwin began publishing paperbacks in the 1960s they did so in an imprint Unwin Books - this mass market sell through subsidiary became a publisher in the nascent alternative culture of the 1960s through the publication of books on philosophy and politics including Marx, Trotsky, Freud, Alan Wood, Zen Buddhism and Yoga, and literature of the far east notably the Chinese translations of Arthur Waley, Russian and Indian writers and the work of Tolkien. Each book in the series was numbered and through the 60s each book contained a full list of the other titles numbering in excess of 80.

A separate numbered list Unwin University Book was launched in 1962 comprising academic titles beginning with Barbara Wootton's The Social Foundations of Wage Policy.

In the 1970s a further list was formed, Unicorn Books, around the posthumous publications of Tolkien, supported by a series of other fantasy works by other authors including Lord Dunsany.

== Allen & Unwin in Australia ==
Allen & Unwin Australia Pty Ltd became independent in July 1990 by means of a management buy-out after the UK firm was bought by HarperCollins. Now known simply as "Allen & Unwin", the company went on to become the most successful "independent" publisher in Australia. It currently publishes up to 250 new titles a year. Among the many authors published by Allen & Unwin are Alex Miller, Christos Tsiolkas, Garth Nix, Jodi Picoult, Kate Morton, Michael Connelly, Thomas Keneally, Peter Corris, Paul Keating, Stephanie Dowrick and Christopher Hitchens. Allen & Unwin is also co-sponsor and publisher of the annual Australian/Vogel Literary Award.

In 2017, Allen & Unwin refused to publish the book Silent Invasion due to legal concerns that it "would be targeted by Beijing and its proxies in Australia."

Allen & Unwin's Australian logo was designed by in-house designer Nada Backovic.

== References and sources ==
=== Sources ===
- "Records of George Allen & Unwin Ltd". University of Reading.
