= Transition from walking to running =

Aspect of human locomotion

Human locomotion is considered to take two primary forms: walking and running. In contrast, many quadrupeds have three distinct forms of locomotion: walk, trot, and gallop. Walking is a form of locomotion defined by a double support phase when both feet are on the ground at the same time. Running is a form of locomotion that does not have this double support phase (switched into double float phase).

== Preferred transition speed ==
The preferred transition speed (PTS) is the speed at which an organism typically changes from one gait to another. Humans spontaneously switch from a walk to a run as speed increases. In humans, the preferred transition speed from walking to running typically occurs around 2.0 m/s (7.2 km/h; 4.5 mph), although slight differences have been shown based on testing methodology.

== Why transition from walking to running at the PTS? ==
Humans are capable of walking at speeds faster than 2.0 m/s, and capable of running at speeds slower than 2.0 m/s. As humans can walk or run at the same pace, researchers have attempted to explain why humans choose the transition speed that they do.

Early researchers suggested that humans transition from walking to running in order to minimize energetic costs. These researchers suggested that the energetic cost to run above 2.0 m/s is lower than the cost of walking above this speed. Conversely, running at speeds slower than 2.0 m/s was suggested to be more costly than walking at these speeds.

This view was largely unchallenged until the late 1980s. Since that time, several studies have shown that transitioning from walking to running actually resulted in an increase in energy expenditure, while other studies have supported an energetic benefit from the transition. In the time since the energetics optimization view was first challenged, a number of mechanical, kinetic, and kinematic factors have been explored to explain the transition. Weak to moderately strong correlations have been found between several variables and the PTS, but work from a variety of researchers in the 1990s and 2000s agrees that ultimately it is fatigue and discomfort (or imminent fatigue/discomfort) in the tibialis anterior and other dorsiflexor muscles of the ankle that is the primary stimulus for the transition from walking to running in humans.

== Energetic factors ==
The energetics of movement are typically measured indirectly through oxygen consumption. Most of the energy for walking is produced through the combustion of nutrients in the presence of oxygen (as opposed to anaerobic or high-intensity exercise which relies increasingly on energy that does not require oxygen for breakdown). Oxygen consumption increases when transitioning from walking to running, despite Ratings of Perceived Exertion (RPE) decreasing. Therefore, people feel that they are not working as hard by switching from walking to running, even though their energy expenditure has increased. Humans would have to transition to running at much faster speeds than 2.0 m/s (4.5 mph) in order for the transition to represent a decrease in energy consumption.

== Mechanical factors ==
Across quadruped species, there is a strong correlation between body mass and the preferred transition speed from trotting to galloping. However, in humans no single anthropometric factor explains the preferred transition speed to a similar degree. In humans the strongest correlations between anthropometric measurements and the PTS come from measurements related to leg length, with a weak correlation between PTS and body mass. In these studies, the strongest correlates came from measurements of total height and lower leg length.

Considering walking with the inverted pendulum model, one can predict maximum attainable walking speed with the Froude number, F = v^2 / lg, where v^2 = velocity squared, l = leg length, and g= gravity. The Froude number is a dimensionless value representing the ratio of Centripetal force to Gravitational force during walking. If the body is viewed as a mass moving through a circular arc centered over the foot, the theoretical maximum Froude number is 1.0, where centripetal and gravitational forces are equal. At a number greater than 1.0, the gravitational force would not be strong enough to hold the body in a horizontal plane and the foot would miss the ground. Humans make the transition from walking to running at a Froude number around 0.5, even under conditions simulating reduced gravity.

=== Kinetic factors ===
Joint kinetic factors appear to be important in triggering trot-to-gallop transitions among quadrupeds. Stress on bones, particularly at joints, is reduced after a transition in these animals; however the same did not occur during the walk-to-trot transition among these animals. The transition therefore may be triggered by different events across species and in the trot-to-gallop versus walk-to-trot transitions in these animals.

In humans, the PTS is believed by some to occur at critical levels of ankle dorsiflexor moments and power. Dorsiflexor muscles show high levels of activation when walking near the PTS and human subjects describe feeling fatigue in these muscles. Ratings of Perceived Exertion (RPE) also decrease after the transition to running, despite a higher energetic expenditure.

The dorsiflexor muscles are small relative to other major muscles of the leg involved in locomotion such as the gluteals, hamstrings, quadriceps and the plantarflexors of the ankle. These muscles must exert large amounts of force at two points during the walking stride at high speeds: 1) The beginning of the stance phase of walking, when the heel touches down and the raised toes must be stabilized to avoid "slapping" the forefoot on the ground. 2) During the swing phase, the trailing leg is moved ahead of the foot planted on the ground and the toes must be raised to avoid colliding with the ground. Because of their relatively small size, these muscles are prone to fatigue quickly when asked to exert large amounts of force during high speed walking. The transition to running reduces the load on the dorsiflexor muscles and reduces the feeling of discomfort associated with fatigue of these muscles.
