= Gait abnormality =

Deviation from normal walking (gait)

- Other names: Abnormalities of gait
- Quadrupedalism in a Kurdish family
- Specialty: Neurology, orthopedics

Gait abnormality is a deviation from normal walking (gait). Watching a patient walk is an important part of the neurological examination. Normal gait requires that many systems, including strength, sensation and coordination, function in an integrated fashion. Many common problems in the nervous system and musculoskeletal system will show up in the way a person walks.

== Presentation and causes ==
Patients with musculoskeletal pain, weakness or limited range of motion often present conditions such as Trendelenburg's sign, limping, myopathic gait and antalgic gait.

Patients who have peripheral neuropathy also experience numbness and tingling in their hands and feet. This can cause ambulation impairment, such as trouble climbing stairs or maintaining balance. Gait abnormality is also common in persons with nervous system problems such as cauda equina syndrome, multiple sclerosis, Parkinson's disease (with characteristic Parkinsonian gait), Alzheimer's disease, vitamin B_{12} deficiency, myasthenia gravis, normal pressure hydrocephalus, and Charcot–Marie–Tooth disease. Research has shown that neurological gait abnormalities are associated with an increased risk of falls in older adults.

Orthopedic corrective treatments may also manifest into gait abnormality, such as lower extremity amputation, healed fractures, and arthroplasty (joint replacement). Difficulty in ambulation that results from chemotherapy is generally temporary in nature, though recovery times of six months to a year are common. Likewise, difficulty in walking due to arthritis or joint pains (antalgic gait) sometimes resolves spontaneously once the pain is gone. Hemiplegic persons have circumduction gait, where the affected limb moves through an arc away from the body, and those with cerebral palsy often have scissoring gait.

== See also ==
- Ataxia
- Foot drop
- Gait Abnormality Rating Scale
- Limp
