= Cost of transport =

Specific resistance due to friction for a mechanism transporting mass

The energy cost of transport (COT) quantifies the energy efficiency of transporting an animal, human, vehicle and/or load from one place to another.

Depending on the field or context, different units are in use, or their inverse. For example, energy consumption per distance travelled and per mass transported in SI units is in joule per metre and per kilogram, or its inverse as energy efficiency. Consumption in J/(kg m) can be reduced to dimensions of m/s², the same as acceleration. Therefore if energy consumption is defined per weight rather than per mass transported, mass is multiplied by g and the resulting dimensionless quantity allows for the comparison of dissimilar animals or modes of transportation. It has a wide range of applications, from comparing human gaits to observing the change in efficiency of trains over time.

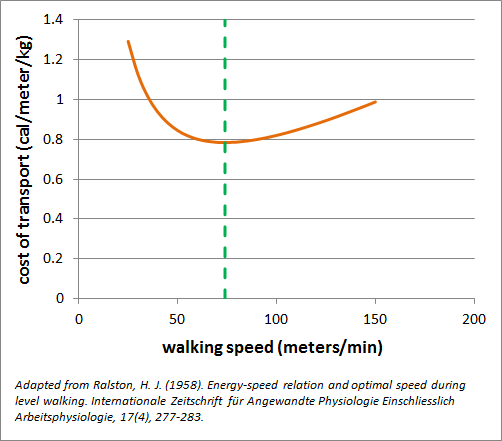
Relationship between walking speed and metabolic cost. The green line indicates the minimum. To get the dimensionless COT, divide by g.

It is calculated in one of two ways, both shown in the following definition:

$\mathrm{COT} \triangleq \frac{E}{mgd} = \frac{P}{mgv}$

where $E$ is the energy input to the system, which has mass $m$, that is used to move the system a distance $d$, and $g$ is Standard gravity. Alternatively, one can use the power input to the system $P$ used to move the system at a constant velocity $v$. The cost of transport is non-dimensional.

It is also called specific tractive force or specific resistance (see von Kármán–Gabrielli diagram). When the energy comes from metabolic processes (i.e., for humans or animals), it is often called the metabolic cost of transport and measured as the aerobic cost in terms of oxygen consumption, as this is often the only way of measuring in particular swimming animals.

A human achieves the lowest cost of transport when walking at 1–1.5 metres per second (2.2–3.4 mph), using 0.8 kcal/(kg km) or at the minimum 3.3 kJ/(kg km). Therefore a person weighing 70 kg consumes metabolic power at a rate of 231 W when walking at 1 m/s and has a dimensionless cost of transport of about 0.34.

Running energetics and running economy for humans are studied mainly in the context of sport. The estimates of COT vary, yet indicate a near independence on running speed between about 1 to 3.5 m/s: ~3.9 J/(kg m) or 1 kcal/(kg km) (~4.184 J/(kg m)).

Human performance can also be measured mechanically, e.g. on a treadmill or instrumented bicycle, and converted with an assumed muscuar efficiency, e.g. 25%. Then only the additional (net) metabolic cost is counted. This allows comparisons of COT to that of motor vehicles, where the basal metabolism of the drivers, personal and passengers is not counted.
