= Peter Schantz =

Swedish physiologist

Professor Peter Schantz

The route and the depots for the 1500 km long ski tour along the Swedish mountain range that was a part of the research expedition TranTre in 1978.

This image is mirroring the laboratory assistant Berit Sjöberg, who worked in the biochemistry laboratory of the Department of Physiology III at the Karolinska Institute, Stockholm, Sweden. She is acknowledged in an essay in Swedish: "Om forskningens dolda krafter och exemplet Berit Sjöberg".

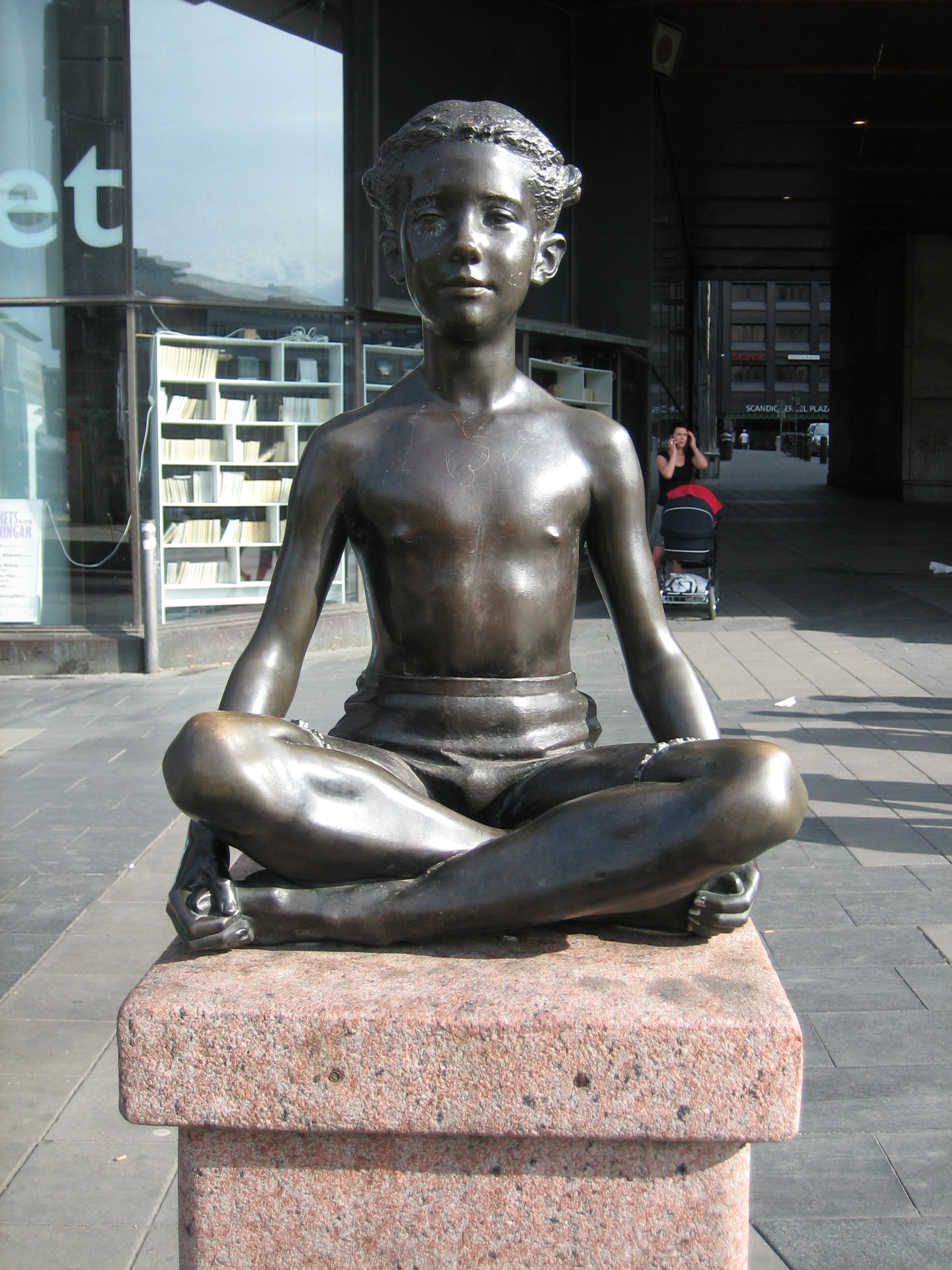
A sculpture of a gymnastic position, by Peter Linde, was in 1988 placed where the Royal Gymnastic Central Institute was located between 1813 and 1944. It is nowadays the location of Sergels torg in Stockholm, Sweden.

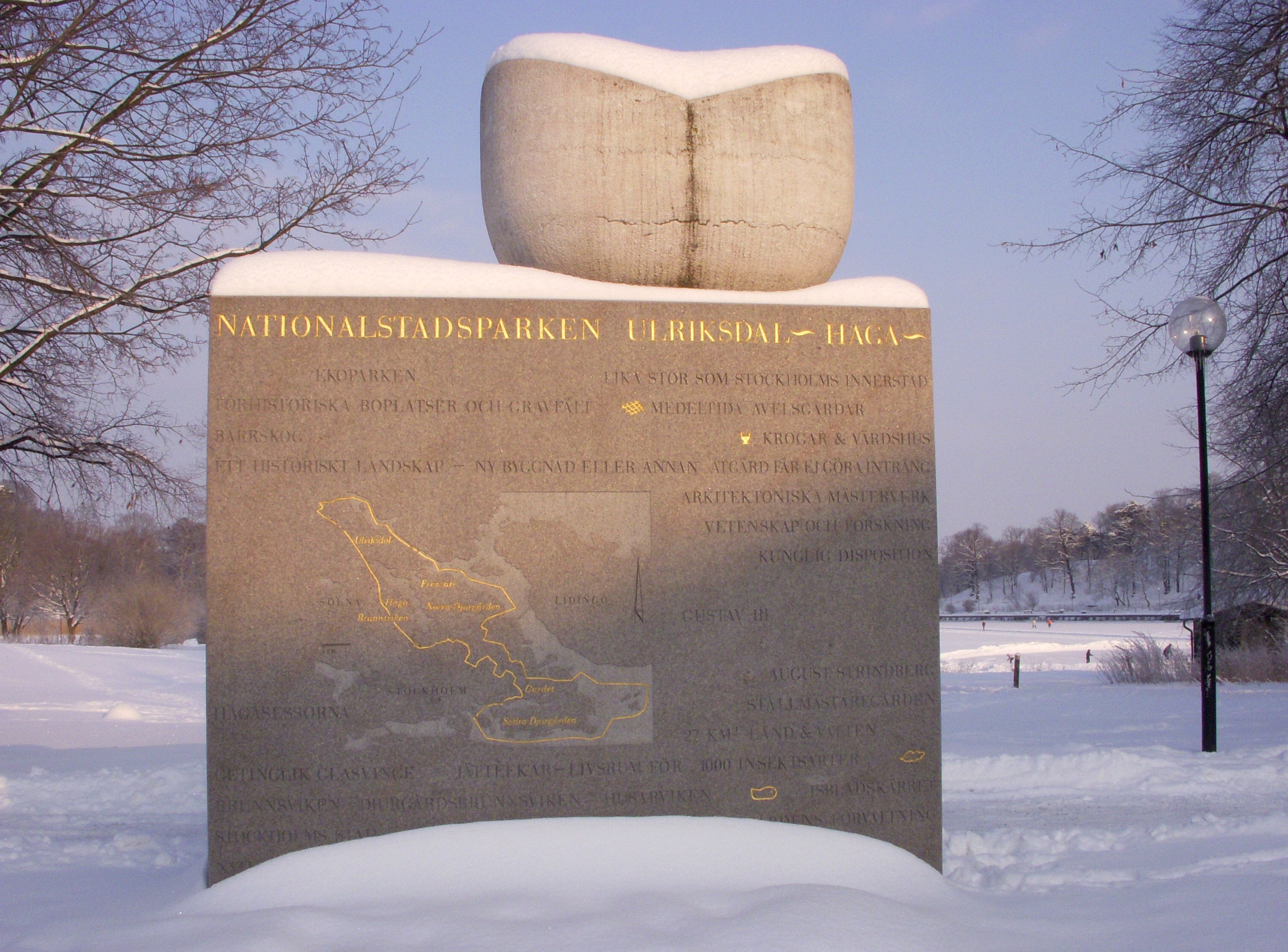
The Monument of the National Urban Park in the Haga Park in Greater Stockholm, Sweden.

Peter Gösta Schantz (born 28 April 1954 in Stockholm, Sweden) graduated as a doctor in medical sciences at the Karolinska Institute in Stockholm in 1986, became a professor in human movement sciences at Mid-Sweden University in Östersund, Jämtland, in 2008, and professor in human biology, including the multidisciplinary field of movement, health and environment, at the Swedish School of Sport and Health Sciences, GIH, in Stockholm, Sweden, in 2013.

Schantz was recruited to become a PhD student by his mentor, professor Per-Olof Åstrand at the Department of Physiology III at Karolinska Institute. He got the basic training as a researcher within the field of exercise physiology, primarily studying the adaptation in human skeletal muscle with physical training and detraining. In order to study whether muscle fibre type transformation, from fast to slow, could occur, studies of 1500 km ski touring along the Swedish mountain range (Fjällmarsch TranTre, in 1978; which he initiated, organized and participated in) and 800 km sledge pulling in the arctic parts of Scandinavia (The 1982 Minnesota Lappland Expedition, organized by Concordia College, Minnesota, USA) were included in his doctoral thesis Plasticity of human skeletal muscle from 1986.

In 2002 he proposed that the dogma formulated by the gymnasiarch Per Henrik Ling in the 19th century, "human movements should be based on the laws of the human organism" should have the following addendum: "and be executed in forms and under conditions that comply with the ecosystem and a sustainable development." He had by that time already expanded his research interests into the multidisciplinary field of physical activity, public health and sustainable development. An initial focus on issues related to outdoor life recreation in periurban green areas is mirrored in the books The National Urban Park – An Experiment in Sustainable Development (2002), The European City and Green Space (2006), Forests, Trees and Human Health (2011)., and Why Large Cities Need Large Parks. Large Parks in Large Cities (2021).

His current research focus is on exercise physiology, environment and active transportation. This has led him to suggest a public health recommendation of 6000 transport steps, five days a week, to gain optimal health effects. To understand how route environmental variables affect the well-being during walking or cycling, he has coined the term: environmental unwellbeing, and initiated explorative studies of environmental unwellbeing – wellbeing in landscapes. He has also developed the route environmental scale ACRES. His studies of the effects of outdoor external environments has led him to the conclusion that they can lower the perceived exertion compared to when given exercise is undertaken in laboratory or other indoor settings. He has also contributed to developing the heart rate method for estimating oxygen uptake to facilitate exercise physiological studies of walking and cycling.

Schantz was involved as expert at the Swedish National Institute of Public Health (2009–2013), and was advisor for WHO in the development of the WHO Health Economic Assessment Tool (HEAT) for cycling and walking.

Schantz has taken several initiatives in the cultural sphere. One of them is the sculpture at the place where the Royal Central Institute of Gymnastics, created by Per Henrik Ling, was placed in Stockholm, Sweden, between 1813 and 1944.

He was also one of the initiators of a process leading to the establishment of the first national urban park in Sweden, i.e. the Royal National City Park in Greater Stockholm.

In 2016 he was awarded the prize of Samfundet S:t Erik, and in 2024 he received the Great Scientific Prize from The Swedish Central Association for the Promotion of Sport.

== Selected bibliography ==
- Schantz, Peter (1986). "Plasticity of human skeletal muscle: with special reference to effects of physical training on enzyme levels of the NADH shuttles and phenotypic expression of slow and fast myofibrillar proteins". Acta Physiologica Scandinavica. 128 (Suppl 558): 1–62. PMID 2950727.
- Schantz, Peter; Henriksson, Jan (1987). "Enzyme levels of NADH shuttle systems: Measurements in isolated muscle fibres from humans of differing physical activity". Acta Physiologica Scandinavica. 129 (4): 505–15. doi:10.1111/j.1748-1716.1987.tb08090.x. PMID 3591372.
- Schantz, Peter; Dhoot, Gurtej (1987). "Coexistence of slow and fast isoforms of contractile and regulatory proteins in human skeletal muscle fibres induced by endurance training". Acta Physiologica Scandinavica. 131 (1): 147–54. doi:10.1111/j.1748-1716.1987.tb08216.x. PMID 2960127.
- Schantz, Peter; Moritani, Toshio; Karlson, Eddy; Johansson, Eva; Lundh, Anna (1989). "Maximal voluntary force of bilateral and unilateral leg extension". Acta Physiologica Scandinavica. 136 (2): 185–92. doi:10.1111/j.1748-1716.1989.tb08651.x. PMID 2782091.
- Wibom, Rolf; Hultman, Erik; Johansson, Mats; Matherei, Kaj; Constantin-Teodosiu, Dimitri; Schantz, Peter (1992). "Adaptation of mitochondrial ATP-production in human skeletal muscle to endurance training and detraining". Journal of Applied Physiology. 73 (5): 2004–10. doi:10.1152/jappl.1992.73.5.2004. PMID 1474078.
- Schantz, Peter; Sjöberg, Berit; Widebeck, Ann-Marie; Ekblom, Björn (1997). "Human skeletal muscle of trained and untrained paraplegics and tetraplegics". Acta Physiologica Scandinavica. 161 (1): 31–9. doi:10.1046/j.1365-201X.1997.201371000.x. PMID 9381947.
- Schantz, Peter; Björkman, Per; Sandberg, Mats; Andersson, Eva (1999). "Movement and muscle activity pattern in wheelchair ambulation by persons with para- and tetraplegia". Scandinavian Journal of Rehabilitation Medicine. 31 (2): 67–76. doi:10.1080/003655099444560. PMID 10380721.
- Schantz, Peter. 2002. Summary. Nationalstadsparken – The National Urban Park – An Experiment in Sustainable Development. Studies of values, law application and developmental Projects. In: Nationalstadsparken – ett experiment i hållbar utveckling.: Studier av värdefrågor, lagtillämpning och utvecklingslinjer / [ed] Lennart Holm, Peter Schantz, Stockholm: Formas, 2002, 249–261 s
- Schantz, Peter (2006). "The Formation of National Urban Parks: a Nordic Contribution to Sustainable Development?". In Clark, Peter (ed.). The European City And Green Space: London, Stockholm, Helsinki And St. Petersburg, 1850–2000. Aldershot: Ashgate. pp. 159–74. ISBN 978-0-7546-5429-2.
- De Vries, S., Claßen, T., Eigenheer-Hug, S-M., Korpela, K., Maas, J., Mitchell, R. & Schantz, P. 2011. Contributions of Natural Environments to Physical Activity. Theory and Evidence Base. (Eds. Nilsson, K.., Sangster, M., Gallis, C., Hartig, T., de Vries, S., Seeland, K.. & Schipperijn, J.). In: Forests, Trees and Human Health, Springer Verlag, Berlin.
- Schantz, Peter; Stigell, Erik (2009). "A Criterion Method for Measuring Route Distance in Physically Active Commuting". Medicine & Science in Sports & Exercise. 41 (2): 472–8. doi:10.1249/mss.0b013e3181877aaf. PMID 19151593.
- Stigell, Erik; Schantz, Peter (2011). "Methods for determining route distances in active commuting – Their validity and reproducibility". Journal of Transport Geography. 19 (4): 563–74. Bibcode:2011JTGeo..19..563S. doi:10.1016/j.jtrangeo.2010.06.006.
- Wahlgren, Lina; Stigell, Erik; Schantz, Peter (2010). "The active commuting route environment scale (ACRES): Development and evaluation". International Journal of Behavioral Nutrition and Physical Activity. 7 (1): 58. doi:10.1186/1479-5868-7-58. PMC 2914072. PMID 20609250.
- Rosdahl, Hans; Gullstrand, Lennart; Salier-Eriksson, Jane; Johansson, Patrik; Schantz, Peter (2009). "Evaluation of the Oxycon Mobile metabolic system against the Douglas bag method". European Journal of Applied Physiology. 109 (2): 159–71. doi:10.1007/s00421-009-1326-9. PMID 20043228. S2CID 8543034.
- Wahlgren, Lina; Schantz, Peter (2011). "Bikeability and methodological issues using the active commuting route environment scale (ACRES) in a metropolitan setting". BMC Medical Research Methodology. 11 (1): 6. doi:10.1186/1471-2288-11-6. PMC 3032758. PMID 21241470.
- Vries, Sjerp; Claßen, Thomas; Eigenheer-Hug, Stella-Maria; Korpela, Kalevi; Maas, Jolanda; Mitchell, Richard; Schantz, Peter (2011). "Contributions of Natural Environments to Physical Activity". Forests, Trees and Human Health. pp. 205–43. doi:10.1007/978-90-481-9806-1_8. ISBN 978-90-481-9805-4.
- Salier Eriksson, Jane; Rosdahl, Hans; Schantz, Peter (2011). "Validity of the Oxycon Mobile metabolic system under field measuring conditions". European Journal of Applied Physiology. 112 (1): 345–55. doi:10.1007/s00421-011-1985-1. PMID 21559947. S2CID 16377328.
- Wahlgren, Lina; Schantz, Peter (2012). "Exploring bikeability in a metropolitan setting: Stimulating and hindering factors in commuting route environments". BMC Public Health. 12 (1): 168. doi:10.1186/1471-2458-12-168. PMC 3311570. PMID 22401492.
- Lundvall, S.; Schantz, P. (2013). "Physical Activities and Their Relation to Physical Education: A 200-Year Perspective and Future Challenges". The Global Journal of Health and Physical Education Pedagogy. 2 (1): 7–16.
- Wallmann-Sperlich, B.; Bucksch, J.; Hansen, S.; Schantz, P.; Froböse, I. (2013). "Sitting time in Germany: Analyses of socio-demographic and environmental correlates". BMC Public Health. 13 (1): 196. doi:10.1186/1471-2458-13-196. PMC 3605332. PMID 23497070.
- Schantz, P. & Lundvall, S. 2014. Changing perspectives on physical education in Sweden. Implementing dimensions of public health and sustainable development. In: Physical Education and Health: Global Perspectives and Best Practice (Eds. Cristopher Edginton & Mingkai Chin), pp 463–475, Urbana, IL, USA: Sagamore Publishing Company
- Schantz, P. 2014. Physical activity behaviours and environmental well-being in a spatial context. In: Geography and Health – A Nordic Outlook. Chief eds. Schærström, A., Jørgensen, S.H. & Sivertun, Å. Swedish National Defence College: Stockholm; Norwegian University of Science and Technology (NTNU): Trondheim; Universität Bonn: Bonn
- Wahlgren, L.; Schantz, P. (2014). "Exploring Bikeability in a Suburban Metropolitan Area Using the Active Commuting Route Environment Scale (ACRES)". International Journal of Environmental Research and Public Health. 11 (8): 8276–8300. doi:10.3390/ijerph110808276. PMC 4143862. PMID 25153462.
- Stigell, E & Schantz, P. 2015. Active Commuting Behaviors in a Nordic Metropolitan Setting in Relation to Modality, Gender, and Health Recommendations. International Journal of Environmental Research and Public Health 12/2015; 12(15008):15626-15648
- "Schantz, P. 2015. Along paths converging to Bengt Saltin´s early contributions in exercise physiology" Scandinavian Journal of Medicine and Science in Sports, Vol. 25, nr Suppl. 4, 7–15
- Johansson, C., Lövenheim, B., Schantz, P., Wahlgren, L., Almström, P., Markstedt A., Strömgren, M., Forsberg, B. & Sommar J.N. 2017. Impacts on air pollution and health by changing commuting from car to bicycle. Science of the Total Environment 584–585:55–63
- Schantz, P (2017). "Distance, duration and velocity in cycle commuting: Analyses of relations and determinants of velocity". International Journal of Environmental Research and Public Health. 14 (10): 1166. doi:10.3390/ijerph14101166. PMC 5664667. PMID 28974051.
- Schantz, P. Wahlgren, L., Salier-Eriksson, J., Sommar, J.N., Rosdahl, H. 2018. Estimating duration-distance relations in cycle commuting in the general population. PLoS ONE 13(11)
- Schantz P, Salier Eriksson J, Rosdahl H. 2019. The heart rate method for estimating oxygen uptake: Analyses of reproducibility using a range of heart rates from cycle commuting. PLoS One 14(7)
- Schantz P, Salier Eriksson J, Rosdahl H. 2019. The heart rate method for estimating oxygen uptake: Analyses of reproducibility using a range of heart rates from commuter walking. Eur J Appl Physiol (p 1-17)
- Schantz P. 2019. Alfred Nobel and his unknown coworker. Norrbottens-Kuriren, December 18
- Strömgren, M., Schantz, P., Nilsson Sommar, J., Raza, W., Markstedt, A. and Forsberg, B. 2020. Modelling commuter modal shift from car trips to cycling: Scenario construction and outcomes for Stockholm, Sweden. Journal of Transport Geography 86 (2020) 102740
- Schantz P, Salier Eriksson, J, Rosdahl, H. 2020. Perspectives on exercise intensity, volume and energy expenditure in habitual cycle commuting. Front. Sports Act. Living 2:65
- Olsson K, Salier Eriksson J, Rosdahl H, Schantz P. 2020. Are heart rate methods based on ergometer cycling and level walking interchangeable? PLoS ONE 15(8): e0237388
- Sommar JN, Schantz P, Strömgren M, and Forsberg B. 2021. Potential for reduced premature mortality by current and increased bicycle commuting: a health impact assessment using registry data on home and work addresses in Stockholm, Sweden. BMJ Open Sport & Exercise Medicine 2021;7:e000980.
- Salier Eriksson, J, Olsson, KSE, Rosdahl H & Schantz, P. 2021. Heart rate methods can be valid for estimating intensity spectrums of oxygen uptake in field exercise. Frontiers in Physiology 12, 687566.
- Schantz P. 2021/2022. Can nature really affect our health? A short review of studies. In: Why Cities Need Large Parks. Large Parks in Large Cities, (ed. R. Murray), London: Routledge/Stockholm: Medströms
- Sommar JN, Johansson C, Lövenheim B, Schantz P, Markstedt A, Strömgren M, Stigson H, and Forsberg B. 2022. Overall health impacts of a potential increase in cycle commuting in Stockholm, Sweden. Scand J Publ. Health 50 (5) 552-564
- Olsson, KSE, Rosdahl, H & Schantz, P. 2022. Interchangeability and optimization of heart rate methods for estimating oxygen uptake in ergometer cycling, level treadmill walking and running. BMC Med Research Methodol 22:55
- Schantz, P, Olsson, KSE, Salier Eriksson, J, & Rosdahl, H. 2022. Perspectives on exercise intensity, volume, step characteristics and health outcomes in walking for transport. Front. Public Health 10:911863
- Andersson, D., Wahlgren, L., Olsson, K.S.E. & Schantz, P. 2023. Pedestrians' perceptions of motorized traffic variables in relation to appraisals of urban route environments. Int. J. Environ. Res. Public Health 2023, 20(4), 3743
- Andersson, D., Wahlgren, L., & Schantz, P. 2023. Pedestrians' perceptions of route environments in relation to deterring or facilitating walking. Frontiers in Public Health 10:1012222
- Olsson, K.S.E., Ceci, R., Wahlgren, L., Rosdahl, H & Schantz, P. 2024. Perceived exertion can be lower when exercising in field versus indoors. PLoS ONE 19(5):e0300776
- Schantz P. 2025. Exploring environmental unwellbeing—wellbeing in landscapes. Geografiska Notiser 83(3-4):119–34
- Andersson, Dan; Wahlgren, Lina; Schantz, Peter (2026). "Pedestrians' Perceptions of Motorized Traffic in Suburban-Rural Areas of a Metropolitan Region: Exploring Measurement Perspectives". Int. J. Environ. Res. Public Health. 23 (206): 1–30. doi:10.3390/ijerph23020206. PMID 3591372.
