= Gait deviations =

Abnormal gait
- Other names: Gait abnormality, 走路外八字 (Taiwanese Chinese), Penguin-like walking
- Though not an amputee, this subject displays spatiotemporal step variability and slight rotation of the upper body and pelvis.
- Specialty: Orthopedics PM&R Neurology
- Causes: Normal pressure hydrocephalus, Hydrocephalus, Parkinson's disease, Spinocerebellar Atrophy, Spinocerebellar Ataxia

Gait deviations are nominally referred to as any variation of standard human gait, typically manifesting as a coping mechanism in response to an anatomical impairment. Lower-limb amputees are unable to maintain the characteristic walking patterns of an able-bodied individual due to the removal of some portion of the impaired leg. Without the anatomical structure and neuromechanical control of the removed leg segment, amputees must use alternative compensatory strategies to walk efficiently. Prosthetic limbs provide support to the user and more advanced models attempt to mimic the function of the missing anatomy, including biomechanically controlled ankle and knee joints. However, amputees still display quantifiable differences in many measures of ambulation when compared to able-bodied individuals. Several common observations are whole-body movements, slower and wider steps, shorter strides, and increased sway.

== Presentation and causes ==
Patients with musculoskeletal pain, weakness or limited range of motion often present conditions such as Trendelenburg's sign, limping, myopathic gait and antalgic gait.

Patients who have peripheral neuropathy also experience numbness and tingling in their hands and feet. This can cause ambulation impairment, such as trouble climbing stairs or maintaining balance. Gait abnormality is also common in persons with nervous system problems such as cauda equina syndrome, multiple sclerosis, Parkinson's disease (with characteristic Parkinsonian gait), Alzheimer's disease, vitamin B_{12} deficiency, myasthenia gravis, normal pressure hydrocephalus, and Charcot–Marie–Tooth disease. Research has shown that neurological gait abnormalities are associated with an increased risk of falls in older adults.

Orthopedic corrective treatments may also manifest into gait abnormality, such as lower extremity amputation, healed fractures, and arthroplasty (joint replacement). Difficulty in ambulation that results from chemotherapy is generally temporary in nature, though recovery times of six months to a year are common. Likewise, difficulty in walking due to arthritis or joint pains (antalgic gait) sometimes resolves spontaneously once the pain is gone. Hemiplegic persons have circumduction gait, where the affected limb moves through an arc away from the body, and those with cerebral palsy often have scissoring gait.

== Lower-limb amputations ==
Human leg bones labeled

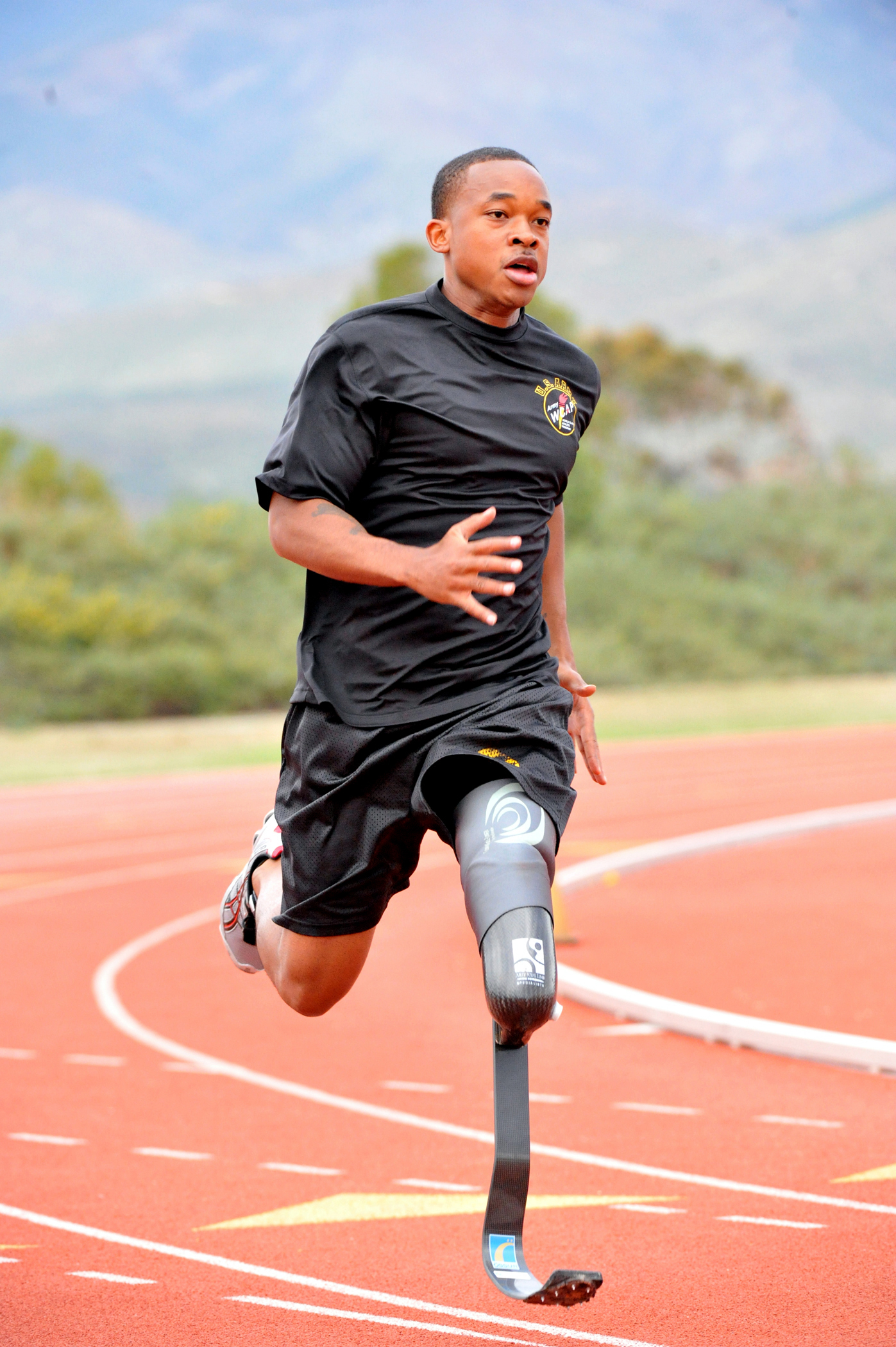
An athlete with a single below-knee amputation using a running blade prosthetic

Over 185,000 amputations occur annually, with approximately 86% of incidents being lower-limb amputations. The majority of cases are reportedly caused by vascular disease (54%) and trauma (45%). Lower-limb amputees are further categorized by where the amputation occurs with respect to the knee joint. However, 34.5% of individuals with an initial foot or ankle amputation experience a progression of symptoms leading to subsequent amputations at higher levels of limb loss. Out of these reamputation cases, diabetic patients had a higher likelihood of requiring further amputations, regardless of initial amputation location. The rate of amputation has decreased significantly with the introduction and optimization of revascularization to combat vascular disease. An increasingly studied trend in amputation rates is the gender disparity of women receiving more surgical revascularization treatments and less amputations than male counterparts.

=== Transtibial ===
An amputation between the knee and ankle joints transecting the tibia, or shinbone, is referred to as a transtibial amputation. In this situation, the patient may retain volitional control over the knee joint. The cause of amputation may dictate the length of the residual limb and the corresponding level of control of the prosthesis. The main impairment for transtibial amputees is the lack of adjustment of the foot and ankle. The foot acts as a lever arm directly attached to the calf muscle, but more than that, it absorbs the impulse from the ground and adapts dynamically to changes in the ground's surface. Transtibial amputees lose the muscle activation pathways necessary for the physical ability to generate work about the ankle joint, as well as the somatosensory and proprioceptive pathways of the lower leg.

=== Transfemoral ===
Unlike transtibial amputations, transfemoral amputations occur between the hip and the knee joints, along the length the femur. Therefore, the patient's residual limb is controlled solely by the hip joint. Implementing a prosthetic leg requires the user to mechanically control the behaviors of the prosthetic knee and ankle joints through gross adjustments of the hip, rather than the finer and more precise movements of the missing joints. Simple tasks such as walking on level ground, sit-to-stand transfers, and climbing stairs require complex alternative muscle activation patterns because the amputee cannot generate a moment about the prosthetic knee. This poses a problem when knee flexion is required, especially during the transition from the stance phase to the swing phase. Transfemoral amputees, on average, have more variability in stride length and walking speed, more asymmetry in temporal measures between limbs, and have an overall slower walking speed than transtibial amputees.

== Compensatory Behaviors ==
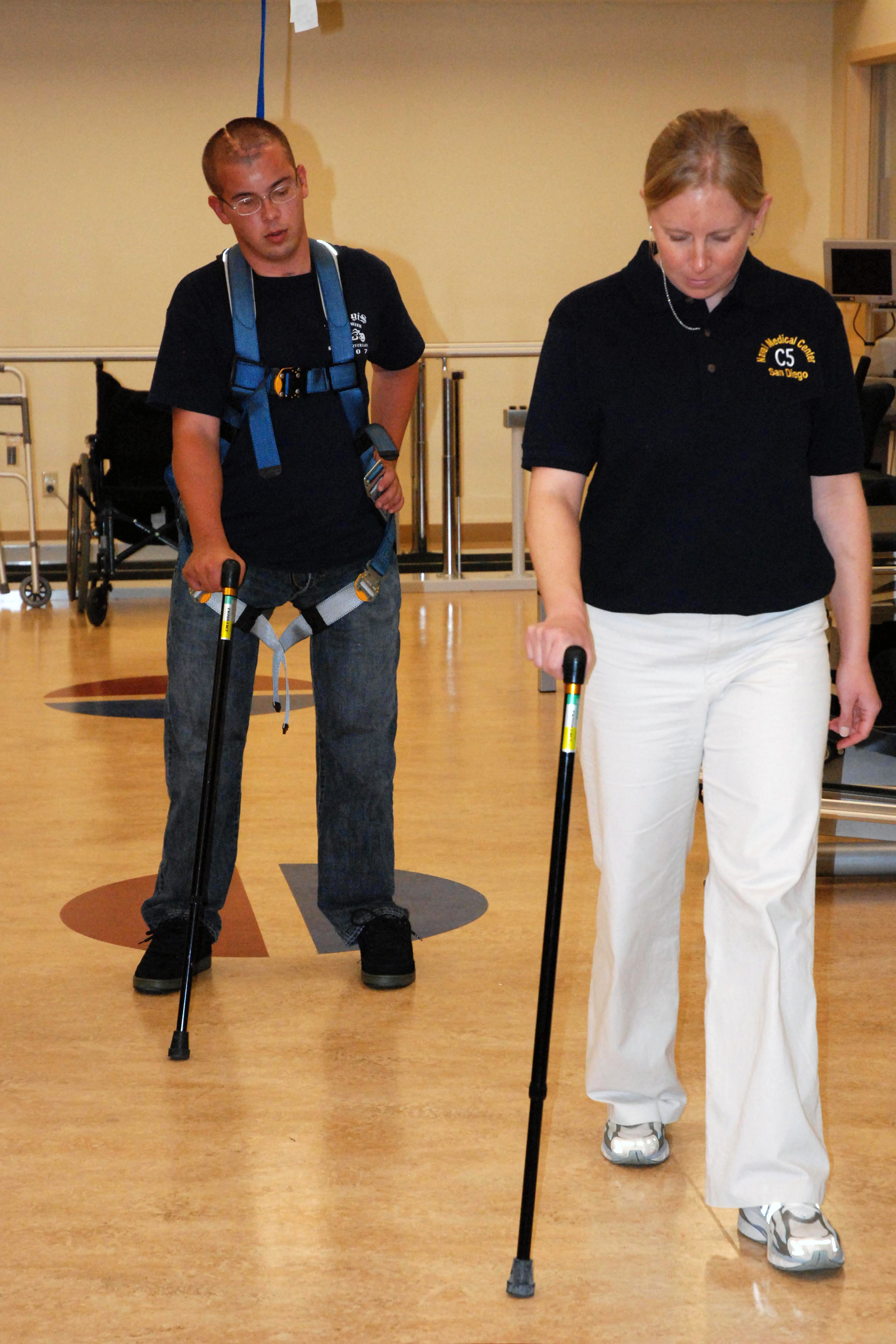
A man with two prosthetic legs uses a hands-free harness walking gait training device during a therapy session

Unimpaired human gait is characterized by its symmetry about the sagittal plane. In impaired individuals such as amputees, gait abnormalities are visible to the naked eye. Amputees often employ strategies known as protective gait behaviors to compensate for their impaired balance and control. These behaviors are most commonly categorized into increased general [body] and [torso] movement and increased variability of strides. The variability can manifest as a combination of differences in the length and width of the strides in comparison to the intact limb.

=== Bodily involvement ===
Before microprocessor-controlled prosthetic joints, the major findings were that the most noticeable movements could be seen in the shoulders, not the hips, and all subjects had uneven pelvic rotations, with more rotation on the prosthetic side. On average, the pelvic inclination is highest in transfemoral amputees in static non-walking studies. The integration of motion capture technology has been beneficial to more recent dynamic walking studies. Rotation of the pelvis is especially essential in transfemoral amputees for lifting the prosthesis and providing foot clearance. This behavior is colloquially known as 'hip-hiking'. As such, rotation and obliquity of the pelvis have been determined to be instrumental in producing more symmetric gait, even when the rotation itself is asymmetric between intact and impaired limbs. Torso or trunk motion is also linked to amputee gait, specifically increasing upper-body ranges of motion with decreasing walking velocity. Another study observed a coupling of torso and pelvis rotations. They noted that the 'hip-hiking' behavior made the rotations of the upper and lower body 'in' or 'out' of phase depending on the severity of the walking impairment, with the amputee subjects having a near-fully coupled bodily rotation. Torso involvement is not as readily apparent in able-bodied individuals. It is hypothesized that this gait deviation could lead to lower back pain.

=== Stride length ===
Stride length refers to the distance in the direction of forward motion that is between heel strikes of successive footfalls or steps. During the gait cycle, amputees have characteristically shorter time spent in the stance phase on the prosthetic limb compared to the intact limb. Stride length is arguably the most visible of the changes in amputee gait because it creates such an asymmetry between the intact and impaired limbs. However, the shorter stance time may help the amputee compensate for the greater margin of error of the prosthetic limb, and several sources suggest the shorter strides are beneficial towards maintaining a straight walking path.

=== Step width ===
Step width refers to the distance between the feet. A connection exists between step width and gait instability, though it is difficult to discern the difference between correlation and causation. Increased step width is commonly accepted as an indicator of gait instability because it is a coping mechanism to deal with external or environmental balance perturbations. A similar widening of step width and concordant slowing of gait speed has been observed between populations of elderly, obese, pregnant women, and amputees. Physically widening the distance between feet in a standing posture increases the structural stability of the body by widening the base of support or foundation. External lateral support mechanisms have been used to isolate the variable of balance in able-bodied subjects and succeeded in reducing both metabolic cost and step width. A similar experimental setup was used on transtibial and transfemoral amputees: transtibial amputees had reduced energy cost and step width, but transfemoral subjects had increased cost and a more marginal reduction in step width, possibly due to the harness interfering with necessary pelvic movements.

== Gait Deviations ==
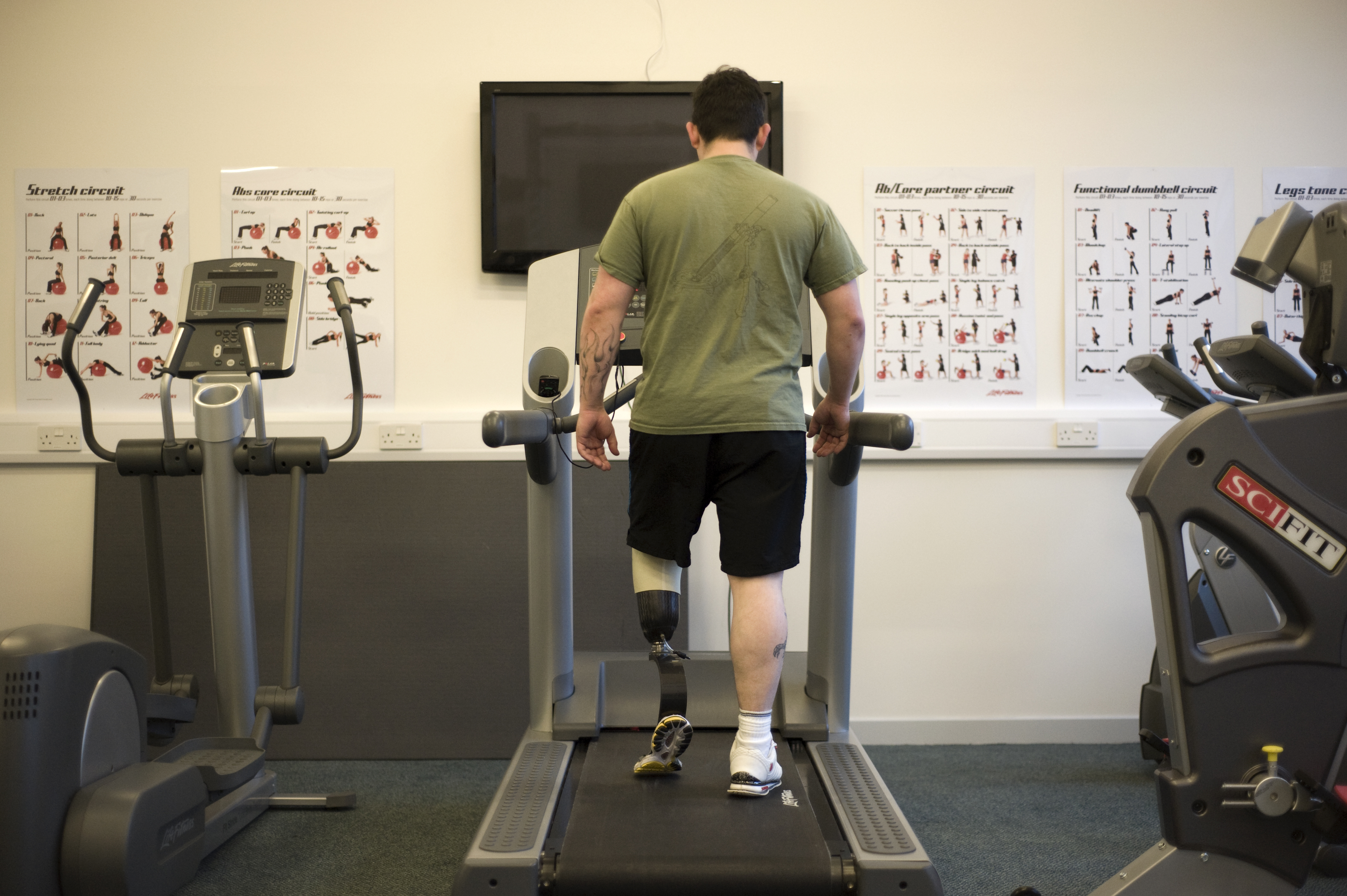
A man with a single prosthetic leg exercising on a treadmill

The compensatory behaviors listed above describe the observable differences in ambulation between amputees and able-bodied individuals. The following gait deviation measurements quantify differences using gait analysis and other tests that typically necessitate specialized instrumentation or clinical environments.

=== Metabolic cost ===
Energy expenditure is commonly used as a measure of gait quality and efficiency. Human metabolic rates are usually recorded via measuring the maximal oxygen consumption (VO_{2} max) during controlled incremental exercise under observation. Treadmills are used for gait analysis and standard walking tests. Able-bodied and athletic individuals on average have smaller metabolic costs than impaired individuals performing identical tasks.

The values from a theoretical model and experimental analyses are listed below:

- Transtibial amputees experience 9-33% increase
- Transfemoral amputees experience 66-100% increase

Another source compiled a list of average metabolic cost increases categorized by amputation location and by cause of amputation:

- Transtibial (traumatic) amputees experience 25% increase
- Transtibial (vascular) amputees experience 40% increase
- Transfemoral (traumatic) amputees experience 68% increase
- Transfemoral (vascular) amputees experience 100% increase

=== Comfortable walking speed ===
Although heavily related to the metabolic cost and overall optimization of the gait, the self-selected walking speed of amputees is significantly lower than able-bodied individuals. Average values for comfortable walking speeds drastically vary between subjects because it is a personal measure. The speeds can be lower than 0.60 m/s or as high as 1.35 m/s. In comparison, self-selected elderly walking speeds are commonly below 1.25 m/s, and the reported comfortable walking speed of the able-bodied subjects is approximately 1.50 m/s.

=== Mechanical work ===
To compensate for the amputated segment of the limb, the residual joints are used for behaviors such as foot placement and general balance on the prosthetic limb. This increases the mechanical work generated by the residual joints on the amputated side. The intact limb is typically more adept at maintaining balance and is therefore relied upon more drastically, such as the behavior in a limping gait. Accordingly, the joint torques and general power of the intact side must increase as compared to an able-bodied individual. Even with the advanced computerized knee joint of Otto Bock's C-Leg transfemoral prosthesis, the subjects experienced increased braking and propulsive impulses than that of the standard double inverted pendulum model of normal human gait.

=== Other deviations ===
- Lateral sway
- Step variability
- Internal rotation

Similar to decreased stride length and increased step width, lateral sway is generally postulated to be an indication of gait instability. The gait naturally widens to account for a greater instability or external perturbations to balance. Step variability is also related to balance and lateral stability. The variability in length and width of steps can be attributed to a level of responsiveness to external factors and perturbations, or an indication of inherent instability and lack of control. This has been a common discussion in analysis of elderly gait as well. Internal rotation is a culmination of measures of the hip and knee joints as well as the pelvic rotation and obliquity during gait. Typically, this has to be measured through motion capture and ground reaction force. Individual parameters can be calculated with inverse kinematics.

== Influential Factors ==
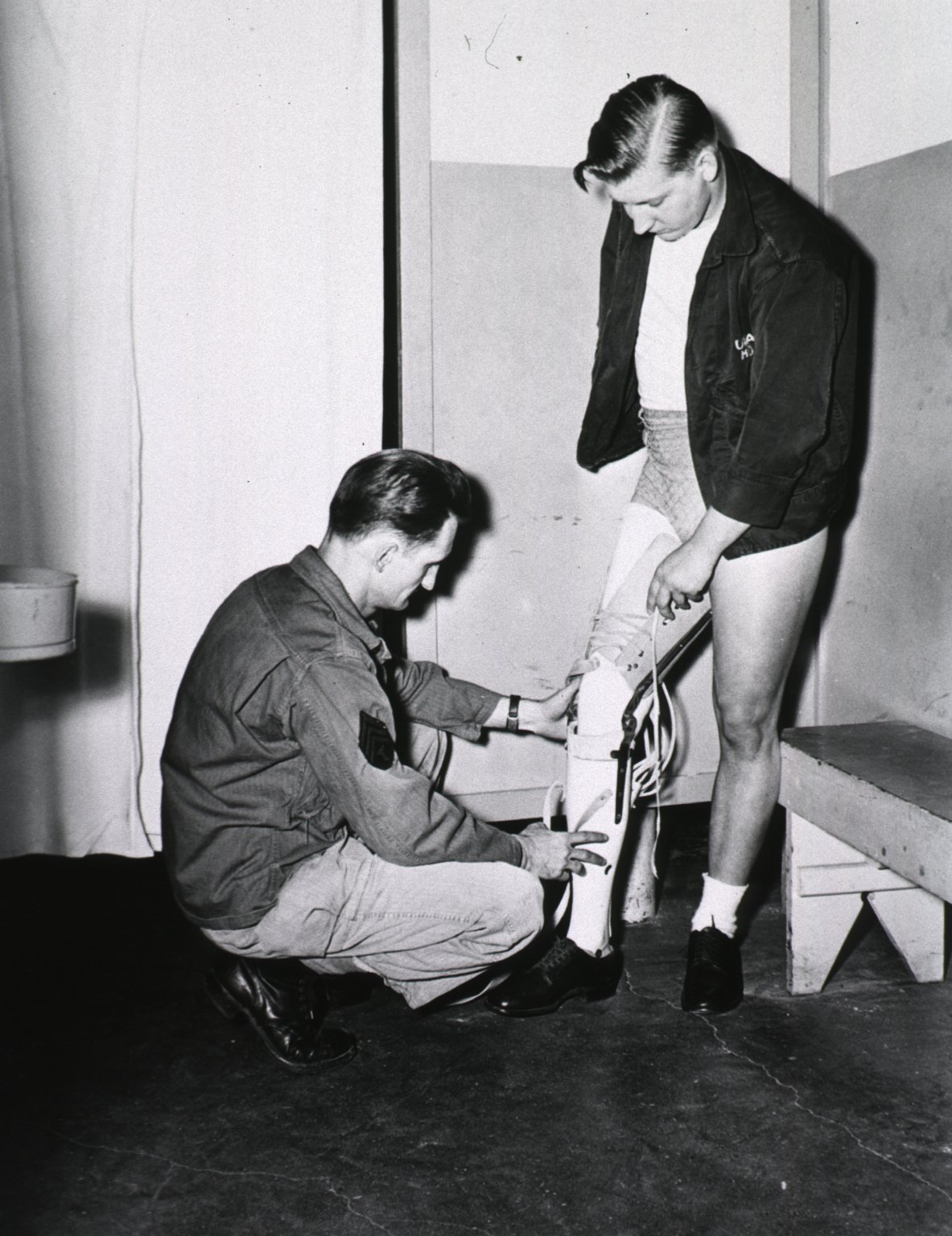
Prosthetic leg being fitted to young man

Across the field of research, many studies are focused on assessing how different factors can influence the overall gait of amputee subjects. The following list shows examples of factors that are believed to influence the gait characteristics of lower-limb amputees:

- Weight of prosthesis
- Distribution of weight
- Alignment of components
- Overall fit of prosthesis

=== Prosthetic weight and distribution ===
A common trend in modern technology is the push to create lightweight devices. A 1981 collection of studies on amputees showed a 30% increase in metabolic cost of walking for an able-bodied subject with 2-kg weights fixed to each foot. Correspondingly, transfemoral prostheses are on average only about one third of the weight of the limb they are replacing. However, the effect of added mass appears to be less significant for amputees. Small increases in mass (4-oz and 8-oz) of a prosthetic foot had no significant effect and, similarly, adding 0.68-kg and 1.34-kg masses to the center of the shank of transfemoral prostheses did not alter metabolic cost at any of the tested walking speeds (0.6, 1.0, and 1.5 m/s). In another study, muscular efforts were significantly increased with added mass, yet there was no significant impact on walking speeds and over half of the subjects preferred a prosthetic that was loaded to match 75% weight of the sound leg. In fact, it has been reported in several articles that test subjects actually prefer heavier prostheses, even when the load is completely superficial.

=== Alignment and fit ===
Initial alignment of a prosthetic leg is conducted by a prosthetist or physician to ensure proper use of the limb. The length of the residual limb is related to the amount of asymmetry in the walking pattern, with longer stumps on average having greater control. Misalignment of joints could result in postures similar to those seen in congenital malformations such as bow-leggedness, knock-knee, pigeon toe, and club foot. Misaligned sockets can simulate excessive hip and knee flexion and extension. As individuals get more experience on the limb, it is expected that they will optimize the alignment for their own preference.

Transtibial

In transtibial amputees, the adjustment of the foot is highly influential to gait changes. Proper alignment of the prosthetic foot about the ankle joint causes metabolic cost and gait symmetry at the anatomical hip and knee joints to improve, with hip flexion-extension motion being the most sensitive to alignment. Excessive rotational misalignment of the foot is compensated by internal rotation of the residual hip joint. Proper alignment of the transtibial prosthesis socket significantly reduced the loading on the intact limb during an 11-meter walk test, indicating that a misaligned limb could have drastic long-term consequences on the sound side of the body.

Transfemoral

Systematic changes to transfemoral prosthetic alignment altered the flexion-extension behavior of the hip, changing fore-aft ground reaction forces and the antero-posterior moments at the knee and ankle joints. The sole reliance on the hip joint to control the entire prosthetic limb makes fine-tuning foot placement difficult. Lowering the knee joint height was found to effectively increase the hip joint's lever arm, thereby increasing precision control of the hip joint to improve gait symmetry and increase running velocity by 26% on average.

== See also ==
- Gait training
- Rehabilitation engineering
- Biomedical engineering
