= Submaximal performance testing =

Submaximal performance testing is a way of estimating either VO_{2} max or "aerobic fitness" in sports medicine. The test protocols do not reach the maximum of the respiratory and cardiovascular systems. Submaximal tests are used because maximal tests can be dangerous in individuals who are not considered normal healthy subjects and for elite athletes maximal tests would disrupt training load balance.

First submaximal cycle test was developed by Åstrand and Ryhming in 1954, and is called Åstrand test. Other well-known submaximal cycle test is known as Physical Work Capacity (PWC 170) test.

One of the first submaximal running test is well-known Cooper test developed by Kenneth H. Cooper in 1968.

== See also ==
- Training effect
- VO_{2} max.
