= Åstrand =

Åstrand is a Nordic surname that may refer to

- Christina Åstrand (born 1969), Danish violinist
- Jonathan Åstrand (born 1985), Finnish sprinter
- Per-Olof Åstrand (1922–2015), Swedish physiologist
  - Åstrand test, a way of measuring VO_{2} max (maximum rate of oxygen consumption during incremental exercise)
