= Henrik Nerlund =

Swedish architectural historian

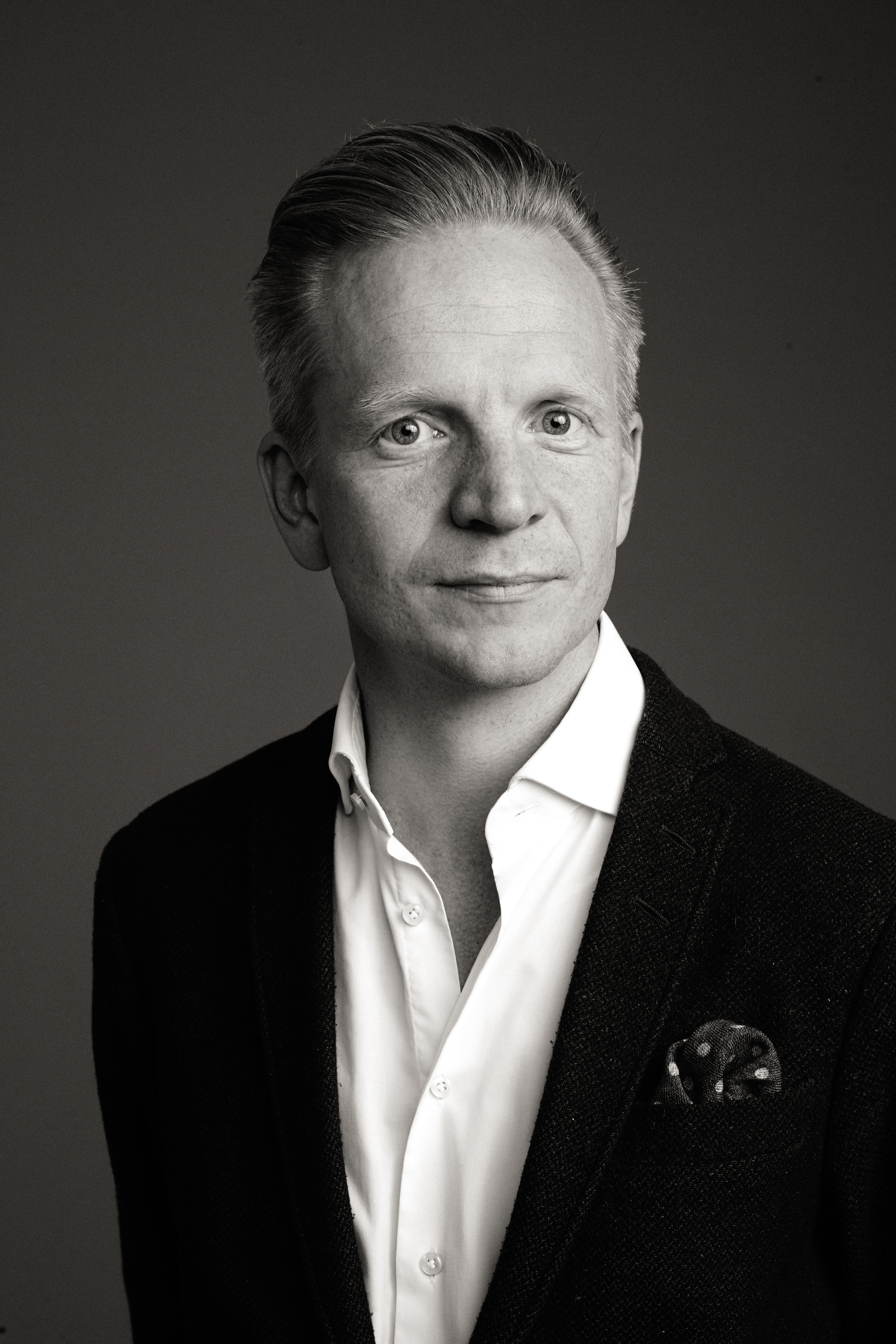
- Henrik Nerlund. Photograph by David Möller.
- Born: August 14, 1978; Stockholm, Sweden
- Occupations: Architectural historian; Journalist; author

Magnus "Henrik" Erkki Nerlund (August 14, 1978, in Stockholm) is a Swedish architectural historian, author and museum professional.

Nerlund specializes in cultural heritage issues and urban renewal in 20th-century built environments. Since 2014, he has served as secretary and director for the Council for Urban Aesthetics in Stockholm (Skönhetsrådet). Nerlund was appointed by the Swedish government as a member of the board of Moderna Museet (Sweden’s museum of contemporary art and architecture) in 2025. He is Sweden's representative on the scientific committee for 20th-century cultural heritage in the global expert organization ICOMOS.

== Bibliography ==
- Aesthetic Vision and Urban Design, Diss. Lic Phil. (Vision och gestaltning: En undersökning av Skönhetsrådets aktörskap, argumentation och maktutövning genom autonomi, kunskap och nätverk i formandet av Stockholm utifrån två fallstudier. Licentiatavhandling, Monografi) (2024)
- Signs in the City (Tecken på stan: om ord och symboler i vår stadsmiljö - fem essäer) (2023) with Martin Rörby
- Beauty, Utility and Strength - The Council for Urban Aesthetics in Stockholm over 100 Years (Skönhet, nytta och beständighet – Skönhetsrådet och Stockholms utveckling under 100 år) (2019)
- Park in Peace – Car Parks and Emergency Facilities (Parkera i fred – Biltempel och beredskapsanläggningar) (2017)
- Renaissance for Bourgeois Town Planning - Five pillars for urban renewal of Sweden's cities (Renässans för den borgerliga stadsplaneringen – fem grundpelare för ett stadsskick för Sveriges städer) (2014)
- Stockholm in the Global Economy (Stockholm i den globala förkastningen – om den täta stadens renässans efter avindustrialisering och innerstadsförfall) (2014) with Jan Jörnmark
- Ghost gas stations – a journey in aesthetics, architecture, rust, destruction, decay and nostalgia (Spökmackar – en resa i estetik, arkitektur, rost, förstörelse, förfall och nostalgi) (2012)

== Selected articles ==
- Stockholm bör växa mer genomtänkt (Svenska Dagbladet 2023-07-29)
- En ny stad i staden (Yearbook of Samfundet S:t Erik 2022)
- Arkitektoniska principer – Solnas skalor från detalj till helhet (Architectural Plan for the City of Solna 2022)
- Skönhetsrådet i ständig kamp för estetisk kvalitet (Arkitekten nr 10 2019)
- Det underjordiska City (Yearbook of Samfundet S:t Erik 2018)
- Farsta - med Stockholmslandskapet som utgångspunkt (Yearbook of Samfundet S:t Erik 2017)
- Planera för kvalitativ förtätning i ett större sammanhang (PLAN no 2 2017)
- Förtätningsstrategier i efterkrigstidens förorter (Bebyggelsehistorisk tidskrift no 67 2014)
- Dags att planera större (Arkitekten no 5 2014)
- Laddad historia hotas av rivning (Dagens Nyheter 2013-02-25)
