= Lower-limb walking pattern =

The function of the lower limbs during walking is to support the whole-body against gravitational forces while generating movement patterns which progress the body forward. Walking is an activity that is primarily confined to the sagittal plane, which is also described as the plane of progression. During one gait cycle, there are two major phases: stance and swing. In a healthy individual walking at a normal walking speed, stance phase makes up approximately 60% of one gait cycle and swing makes up the remaining 40%. The lower limbs are only in contact with the ground during the stance phase, which is typically subdivided into 5 events: heel contact, foot flat, mid-stance, heel off, and toe off. The majority of stance phase (~40%) takes place in single-limb support where one limb is in contact with the ground and the contralateral limb is in swing phase. During this time interval, the lower limb must support constant changes in alignment of body weight while propelling forward. The hip, knee, and ankle joints move through cyclical kinematic patterns that are controlled by muscles which cross these joints. As postural changes occur, the body adapts by motor tuning an efficient muscular pattern that will accomplish the necessary kinematics required to walk.

Kinetic and kinematic measures together, are powerful tools that help infer joint patterns and understand how patterns may alter in the presence of physical or environmental changes. In kinetic measures of ground reaction force, the shape of the vertical ground-reaction force is consistent and well known. Researchers have spent decades trying to establish a direct connection between kinetic patterns and muscle activity. Since the musculoskeletal system is complex, identifying all individual muscle contributions is challenging, therefore net joint moments are most commonly examined. In 1980, a principle called the support moment was introduced. It described a total lower-limb pattern occurring at the hip, knee, and ankle during stance. According to this principle, the basic function of the lower limbs during stance phase is to resistant collapse; and to prevent this collapse, vertical support of the body requires net extensor activity at the hip, knee, and ankle joints. Other reports suggest that the necessary amount of force generated by a muscle to produce a given moment about the axes of rotation at a joint, is dependent on limb position.

== Sagittal plane kinematics ==
=== Hip ===
At heel contact the hip is maximally flexed at approximately 30 degrees. The hip extensor muscles are active and prepared to extend the hip to prevent any uncontrolled trunk flexion over the femur. Once the foot is flat on the ground, the hip gradually extends in preparation for weight acceptance as the whole-body moves forward over the stance foot. Between 30-50% of the gait cycle, the hip flexor muscles are eccentrically acting as the hip continues to extend, until reaching maximal extension at approximately 10-15 degrees past neutral. This max extension takes place right before toe off. The hip flexors then concentrically act to initiate hip flexion for swing phase. Overall, approximately 30 degrees of flexion and 10 degrees of extension (from neutral) are needed at the hip joint for a normal walking pattern.

=== Knee ===
The knee has a more complex movement pattern compared to the hip. At heel contact the knee extensor and flexor muscles co-contract to provide stability for the knee joint since it is almost maximally extended at that point in time. Shortly after, as the foot becomes flat on the ground, the knee gradually flexes approximately 10-15 degrees reaching the maximum at about 15% of the gait cycle. This small amount of knee flexion is controlled eccentrically by the knee extensor muscles which serve the purpose of cushioning the rate of loading on the lower limb and preventing excessive knee flexion. Following through to mid-and terminal stance, the knee gradually extends with concentric activity of the knee extensor muscles and approaches near full extension as heel off occurs (30-40% of gait cycle). At this point the knee flexor muscles concentrically flex the knee again for swing phase. The maximum knee flexion that occurs during swing is about 60 degrees.

=== Ankle (talocrural) ===
Sagittal plane motions of the ankle occur at the talocrural joint. As the heel contacts the ground the ankle joint is near neutral in either slight plantar flexion or dorsiflexion. Immediately following heel strike the ankle plantar flexes until the foot is positioned flat on the ground. This plantar flexion movement is controlled eccentrically by the ankle dorsiflexors. As the body glides over the fixed foot, a maximum of about 10 degrees of ankle dorsiflexion is reached. The ankle dorsiflexion is a result of the tibia moving forward over the foot and is facilitated by eccentric control provided by the soleus. Concurrently, the knee reaches full extension and as the heel rises off the ground the ankle begins to plantar flex. The ankle reaches a maximum of 15-20 degrees of plantar flexion right before push-off which is accomplished concentrically by the plantar flexor muscles. Right after toe off the ankle is dorsiflexed to neutral position for toe clearance during swing phase.

== Joint moment patterns ==
The ground reaction force creates external moments on the joints of the lower limb. Activation of muscles and other passive connective tissues (e.g., ligaments, tendons) create what is known as internal moments that control joint motions. When a joint motion occurs in the direction of a muscle's action it is concentrically acting. If a joint motion occurs in the opposite direction of a muscle's action then the muscle is eccentrically acting. Therefore, the magnitude of the internal moment reasonably matches the described muscular activations.

=== Hip ===
At heel strike the vertical ground reaction force is located anterior to the axis of rotation of the hip joint and generates an external hip flexion moment. To counteract this external flexion moment, an internal hip extension moment is generated. This extension moment continues through the first half of stance to keep the knee from collapsing and decelerate the trunk from rotating forward. During the last half of stance the body glides over the fixed stance foot and the vertical ground reaction force moves posterior to the axis of rotation of the hip joint. This creates an external hip extension moment, which must be resisted by an internal hip flexion moment. This flexion moment decelerates the extension motion occurring at the thigh and then pulls the hip into flexion for swing phase.

=== Knee ===
At heel strike the vertical ground reaction force is located anterior to the axis of rotation of the knee joint. Momentarily, this creates an external knee extension moment during the first percent of stance. To counteract this moment, an internal knee flexion moment is generated to assist with stabilizing the knee joint as it prepares for weight acceptance. Once the foot is flat the vertical ground reaction force moves posterior to the knee joint as the trunk glides over the stance foot, resulting in an external knee flexion moment. This is counteracted by an internal knee extension moment which continues through the rest of stance. This knee extension moment assists with weight acceptance and deceleration of the forward motion of the center of mass.

=== Ankle (talocrural) ===
At heel strike the vertical ground reaction force is located posterior to the axis of rotation of the ankle joint. An external plantar flexion moment is created which must be resisted by an internal dorsiflexion moment. Once the foot is flat and the trunk glides forward over the stance foot, an internal plantar flexion moment is generated to decelerate the forward motion of the body's center of mass. From mid-stance to toe off, however, this moment continues but the function of the plantar flexors switches over to accelerating the knee into extension and propelling the center of mass forward.

== Potential factors affecting lower-limb patterns ==
There are many factors that can affect joint patterns, such as: walking speed, gender, terrain, and gait pathologies. During stance phase the stance limb is considered to be functioning as a closed kinetic chain. Therefore, any type of musculoskeletal impairment would affect not only the joint at which that muscle crosses but also joints throughout the entire chain. Theoretically, if one joint does not adequately contribute during single-limb support, then the other joints must compensate to accomplish the goal of toe clearance and forward progression.

Joint mobility could also affect walking patterns. For instance, if an individual has limited knee extension this could result in a functionally shorter limb affecting kinematics of both the stance and swing limbs. Similarly, a lack of knee flexion could potentially interfere with toe clearance and lead to compensatory patterns at the hip joint such as excessive hip flexion. Limited mobility of the ankle could also result in abnormal gait patterns. When walking at an average speed of ambulation (~1.25 m/s) the ankle joint requires at least 10-20 degrees of plantar flexion. Limited ankle plantar flexion may result in decreased push off force, which could lead to shorter step length. To compensate for this impairment, increased knee or hip flexion of the swing limb would be needed.
