= Per-Olof Åstrand =

Swedish professor of physiology

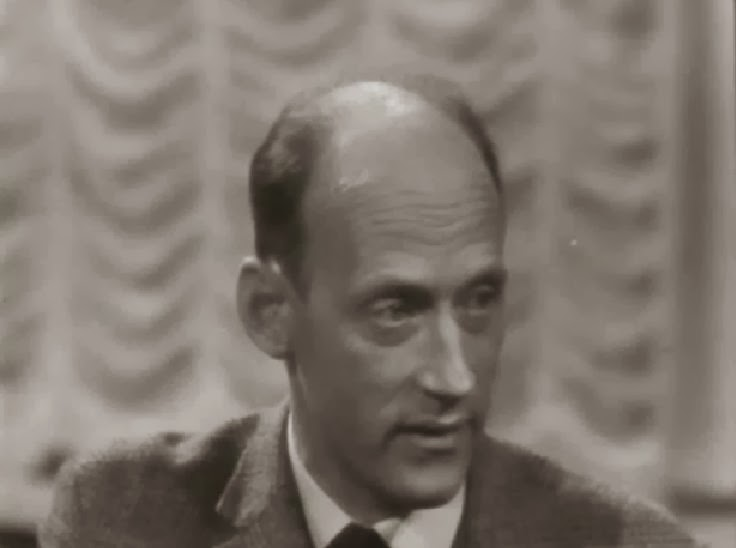
Åstrand in Hylands hörna, 1963

Per-Olof Åstrand (21 October 1922 – 2 January 2015) was a Swedish professor of physiology at the Swedish School of Sport and Health Sciences (GIH) in Stockholm 1970–1977, and 1977–1988 at the Karolinska Institute in Stockholm, Sweden, and a member of the Nobel Assembly at Karolinska Institutet (1977–1988). Åstrand is considered a "pioneer", "legend" and one of the "founding fathers" of modern exercise physiology.

== Career ==
Åstrand graduated from the Royal Central Gymnastics Institute (GCI/GIH) in Stockholm, Sweden, now called the Swedish School of Sport and Health Sciences (GIH) in 1946. Then he was already amanuensis at its Department of Physiology, where he started his thesis work. In 1952 he defended his thesis and got his Ph.D. at the medical school at the Karolinska Institute, since GCI/GIH in those days did not have such rights as a university college. He became a professor in physiology at GCI/GIH in 1970. Åstrand had over 200 research publications and his areas of research included work physiology and the human oxygen transporting system, physical performance, health and fitness, preventive medicine, and rehabilitation.

Åstrand is known for developing the Åstrand-Ryhming Cycle Ergometer Test in 1954 in collaboration with his future wife, Irma Ryhming. His book Textbook of Work Physiology has been translated to eight languages.

Per-Olof Åstrand was Doctor Honoris Causa at eight universities. He was also an honorary member of the American College of Cardiology, the Royal Australasian College of Physicians and the American College of Sports Medicine. In 1953, Åstrand received the American Academy of Physical Education's "Research Citation Award" and in 2000 Åstrand was awarded the first Lifetime Achievement Award in exercise physiology by the American Society of Exercise Physiologists (ASEP).

== See also ==
- August Krogh
- Bengt Saltin
