= Stockholm Beauty Council =

The Council of Urban Aesthetics in Stockholm (Swedish: Stockholms skönhetsråd), officially The Council for the Protection of Ecological and Aesthetic Matters (Rådet till skydd för Stockholms skönhet) is an advisory council of the Stockholm Municipality which inspects city plans and requests for construction permits remitted by various municipal departments. The council is however permitted to initiate cases within its field, which makes it a relatively independent municipal organ.

== Organisation ==
The council has thirteen members of which twelve, representing the authorities, organisations, and groups which nominated them, are appointed by the municipal council. The thirteenth member, by tradition a Stockholm connoisseur, is appointed by the other twelve members. Two of the members are architects representing the Swedish Association of Architects (Sveriges arkitekter) and the National Property Board (Statens fastighetsverk); two are experts on nature conservation representing the Academy of Sciences (Vetenskapsakademien) and the Society for Nature Conservation (Naturskyddsföreningen); two are artists appointed by the Academy of Fine Arts (Konstakademien); and, finally, two are cultural historians appointed by the Academy of Letters, History and Antiquities (Vitterhetsakademien) and Samfundet S:t Erik (a society devoted to the history of Stockholm). Four members are representing the major political parties. The council elects its own chairman, vice chairman, and secretary. It holds sessions once per month.

The council chairman is Inga Varg, while the office is headed by architecture historian Henrik Nerlund.

== Criticism ==
The council has been frequently criticized for being an extremely conservative institution composed of thirteen taste policies and the name of the council was even laughed at upon its creation. Much debated was its objection to a renewal of the Skärholmen suburb where the grey concrete was proposed to be repainted in gaudy colours and, equally debated, was a proposal to discontinue the council in 2005. It is, nevertheless, not a decision-taking institution and historically its objections to controversial proposals, such as the much criticized Redevelopment of Norrmalm, have been ignored. Additionally, a recent alternation of its members is adding new hope the council will be less conservative in the future.

== See also ==
- Samfundet S:t Erik
- Stockholm City Museum
