= American Society of Exercise Physiologists =

US heatlh education organization

The American Society of Exercise Physiologists is a non-profit professional organization for exercise physiologists. Founded in Minnesota in 1997, its vision is to establish board-certified exercise physiologists as experts in the application of "exercise as medicine" to benefit society. As the scientific body of exercise physiology has some overlap with athletics and sports training, the organization advocates for the unique contributions of exercise physiologists and attempts to enhance their public sector job opportunities.

ASEP has created a Code of Ethics and a Board of Accreditation that has accredited seven academic institutions. Its Board of Certification has certified over 200 EPCs in the United States. ASEP leaders believe that exercise physiology is not defined by research, but by the power of exercise as medicine. They believe exercise physiology is the recognition of the physiology that underpins activity; the delivery of health and fitness analysis, improvement and maintenance; the rehabilitation of heart disease and other chronic diseases and disabilities; and the supervision of athletes and people with an interest in athletics and sports training.

The Journal of Exercise Physiology-online is the official ASEP peer-reviewed electronic research journal, featuring original exercise physiology research, reviews and editorials. The Professionalization of Exercise Physiologyonline is the first journal that publishes articles about professionalism in exercise physiology. An official monthly newsletter, ASEPNewsletter, keeps members informed of professional issues and events in exercise physiology. ASEP also maintains a membership directory, career opportunities and resources, board certification, professional networking and development opportunities, annual meetings, student services and a political support base.
