= Bengt Saltin =

Swedish professor in exercise physiology

- Born: 3 June 1935; Stockholm, Sweden
- Died: 12 September 2014 (aged 79); Stockholm, Sweden

Bengt Saltin (3 June 1935 — 12 September 2014) was a Swedish professor in exercise physiology, who spent parts of his career in Denmark.

After starting his medical studies at the Karolinska Institute in Stockholm, Sweden, in the 1950s, he commenced his doctoral studies at the Department of Physiology at the Royal Gymnastic Central Institute (GCI/GIH) in Stockholm in 1960. Per-Olof Åstrand became his tutor, and in 1964 he presented his doctoral thesis. He thereafter proceeded with introducing muscle physiology and biochemistry studies at the same department.

In the 1970s he commenced with the same type of studies at the August Krogh Institute in Copenhagen, Denmark. In the 1990s he returned to Stockholm and the Karolinska Institute for some years, and later he returned to Copenhagen to establish the Copenhagen Muscle Research Institute.

His overall contributions to exercise physiology are among the greater attained in history,

Saltin died in Stockholm, Sweden, on 12 September 2014 after a long illness.

== Publications ==
- Muscle Fatigue Mechanisms in Exercise and Training: 4th International Symposium on Exercise and Sport Biology, 1990 (Medicine and Sport Science) (1992) ISBN 978-3805554831
- Exercise and Circulation in Health and Disease (1999) ISBN 978-0880116329

== See also ==
- August Krogh
- Per-Olof Åstrand
