= Bipedal gait cycle =

The (bipedal) gait cycle is a sequence of movements that characterizes human locomotion. This series of events repeats in a cyclic pattern to create movement.

Each gait cycle has two major phases (relative to a specific lower limb):

- Stance Phase: when the reference foot is in contact with the ground
- Swing Phase: when the reference foot is not in contact with the ground

== Components of gait cycle ==
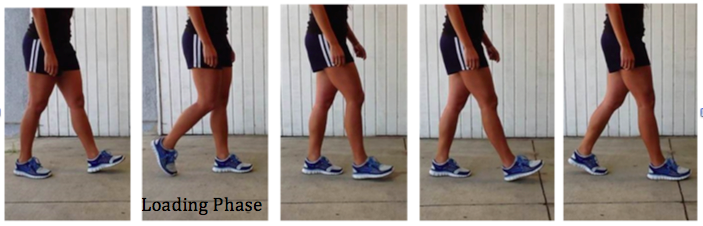
Components of gait cycle

The gait cycle involves propulsion of the centre of gravity in the direction of motion. A single gait cycle is also known as a stride. A gait cycle usually involves co-operative movements of both the left and right lower extremities. A gait cycle consists of stance phase and swing phase. The stance phase spans from initial double-limb stance to single-limb stance and terminal double-limb stance. The swing phase corresponds to the single-limb stance of the opposite leg. The stance and swing phases can further be divided by seven events into seven smaller phases in which the body postures are specific. For analyzing gait cycle one foot is taken as reference and the movements of the reference foot are studied.

=== Stance Phase ===
Stance phase is the part of a gait cycle during which the reference foot remains in contact with the ground. It constitutes ~60% of the gait cycle (10% for initial double-limb stance, 40% for single-limb stance and 10% for terminal double-limb stance). Stance phase consists of four events and four phases:

- Initial Contact (Heel Strike): The heel of the reference foot touches the ground in front of the body. The respective knee is extended while the hip is flexed. This event marks the initiation of stance phase.
- Loading Response (Foot Flat) Phase: The weight is transferred onto the referenced leg. It is important for weight-bearing, shock-absorption and forward progression.
- Opposite Toe-off: The toes of the opposite foot are lifted off the ground, terminating double-limb support.
- Mid-stance Phase: The alignment and balancing of body weight on the reference foot regarding single-limb support. The respective knee flexes while the hip is extending, bringing the torso to the highest vertical position. The center of gravity moves laterally to the supporting-limb side.
- Heel Rise: The heel of the reference foot rises while the toes are still in contact with the ground. This event marks the end of mid-stance phase and the beginning of terminal stance phase.
- Terminal Stance Phase: In this phase the heel of reference foot continues to rise while its toes are still in contact with the ground. The center of gravity is in front of the foot.
- Opposite Initial Contact: The heel of the opposite foot makes contact with the ground while the toes of the reference foot still touch the ground, providing double support. The knee and hip on the reference side are extended. The torso moves to the lowest vertical position.
- Pre-swing Phase: This phase corresponds to the loading response phase of the opposite foot. The center of gravity moves to the opposite side.

=== Swing Phase ===
Swing phase is that part of the gait cycle during which the reference foot is not in contact with the ground and swings in the air. It constitutes about 40% of gait cycle. It can be separated by three events into three phases:

- Toe-off: The toes of reference foot rise above the ground. Flexion of the respective knee and hip is initiated as the foot prepares to swing in air. This event is the beginning of the swing phase of the gait cycle. The body weight is single-supported by the opposite foot.
- Initial Swing Phase: The reference foot moves forward towards the opposite foot, while the knee and the hip are flexing. The body trunk moves laterally to the supporting side.
- Feet adjacent: The reference foot hovers above the ground adjacent to the opposite foot. The knee is most flexed while the torso moves to the highest vertical position.
- Mid-swing Phase: This phase is marked by feet adjacent event. The reference foot moves forward and eventually surpasses the supporting foot while the respective hip continues flexion.
- Tibial Vertical: The hip on the reference side is at its most flexed position in the gait. The orientation of respective tibia is approximately perpendicular to the ground. The event is regarded as the end of mid-swing phase.
- Terminal Swing Phase: During terminal swing phase, the reference foot begins landing to the ground as the respective knee and hip begin extension. The torso surpasses the supporting foot and moves downward

== Terminology ==
- Step Length: The linear distance between corresponding successive points of heel contact of the opposite feet. In normal gait, the right and left step lengths are equal.
- Stride Length: The linear distance between two successive consecutive placements of the same foot. In normal gait, the stride length is double the step length.
- Walking Base or Stride Width: The distance between the line of step of the two feet.
- Cadence: The number of steps per unit time. In normal gait, cadence is about 100–115 steps per minute. Cadence of a person is subject to various factors.
- Gait Average Speed: Distance traveled in a given period of time. Generally measured in meters per second. It is dependent on both cadence and step length.
- Comfortable Walking Speed: It is a characteristic speed at which there is least energy consumption per unit distance. It is about 80 meters per minute in a normal gait.
- Single support: In single support only one foot is in contact with the ground.
- Double support: In double support both feet are in contact with the ground. Double support occurs from heel strike, continues during loading response phase, until the toes of the opposite foot rise off the ground.

== Gait Abnormalities ==
Injuries and preexisting medical disorders can negatively affect the gait cycle. This can result in limping, shuffling, incoordination, and dragging of the feet. These symptoms are commonly caused by injury to the brain, spinal cord, or lower limb. Common gait abnormalities include:

- Antalgic gait
- Spastic gait
- Ataxic gait
- Parkinsonian gait
- Steppage gait
- Waddling gait
