= Åstrand test =

- Purpose: Measuring VO_{2} max

The Åstrand test is a method to estimate VO_{2} max (the maximum rate at which an individual can consume oxygen during exercise), an indicator of cardiovascular fitness. The test involves performing steady, submaximal exercise on a cycle ergometer at gradually increasing intensity (incremental exercise) while monitoring heart rate. This data is used to predict VO₂ max without requiring maximal exertion.
