= Spastic gait =

Gait abnormality

Spastic gait is a form of gait abnormality. It is caused by lesions in the corticospinal tract.

== Presentation ==
A unilateral spastic gait presents with the affected leg held in extension and plantar flexion. The arm on the same side is often flexed. The individual circumducts the affected leg as they swing it during walking.

A bilateral spastic gait may appear stiff-legged or scissoring. The tone of the adductor muscles is increased, so the legs nearly touch with each step. Such a gait is referred to as scissor gait.

== Conditions associated with a spastic gait ==
- Brain tumor
- Brain abscess
- Sturge–Weber syndrome
- Cerebral palsy
- Cerebrovascular accident
- Multiple sclerosis

== Treatment ==
Treatment of spastic gait may include physiotherapy, drugs that relax the muscles (including baclofen and tizanidine), and local botulinum toxin injections.
