= (glycogen-synthase-D) phosphatase =

Class of enzymes

[glycogen-synthase-D] phosphatase

Identifiers
- EC no.: 3.1.3.42
- CAS no.: 9043-28-1

Databases
- IntEnz: IntEnz view
- BRENDA: BRENDA entry
- ExPASy: NiceZyme view
- KEGG: KEGG entry
- MetaCyc: metabolic pathway
- PRIAM: profile
- PDB structures: RCSB PDB PDBe PDBsum
- Gene Ontology: AmiGO / QuickGO
Search
- PMC: articles
- PubMed: articles
- NCBI: proteins

The enzyme [glycogen-synthase-D] phosphatase ({EC 3.1.3.42) catalyzes the reaction

[glycogen-synthase D] + H_{2}O $\rightleftharpoons$ [glycogen-synthase I] + phosphate

This enzyme belongs to the family of hydrolases, specifically those acting on phosphoric monoester bonds. The systematic name is [UDP-glucose:glycogen 4-α-D-glucosyltransferase-D] phosphohydrolase. Other names in common use include uridine diphosphoglucose-glycogen glucosyltransferase phosphatase, UDP-glycogen glucosyltransferase phosphatase, UDPglucose-glycogen glucosyltransferase phosphatase, glycogen glucosyltransferase phosphatase, glycogen synthetase phosphatase, glycogen synthase phosphatase, glycogen synthase D phosphatase, Mg^{2+} dependent glycogen synthase phosphatase, and phosphatase type 2 °C.
