= Samfundet S:t Erik =

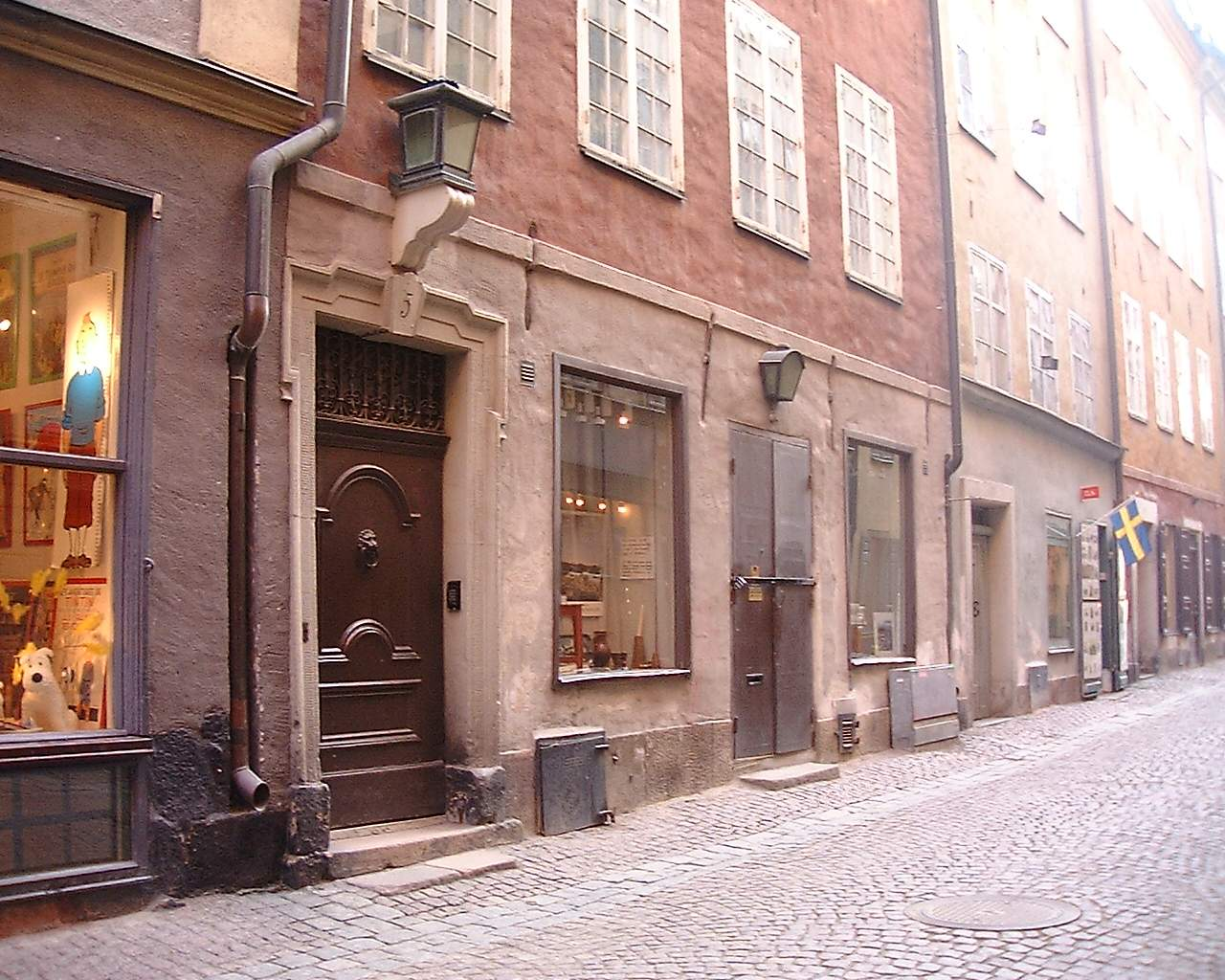
Official address of Samfundet S:t Erik at Köpmangatan.

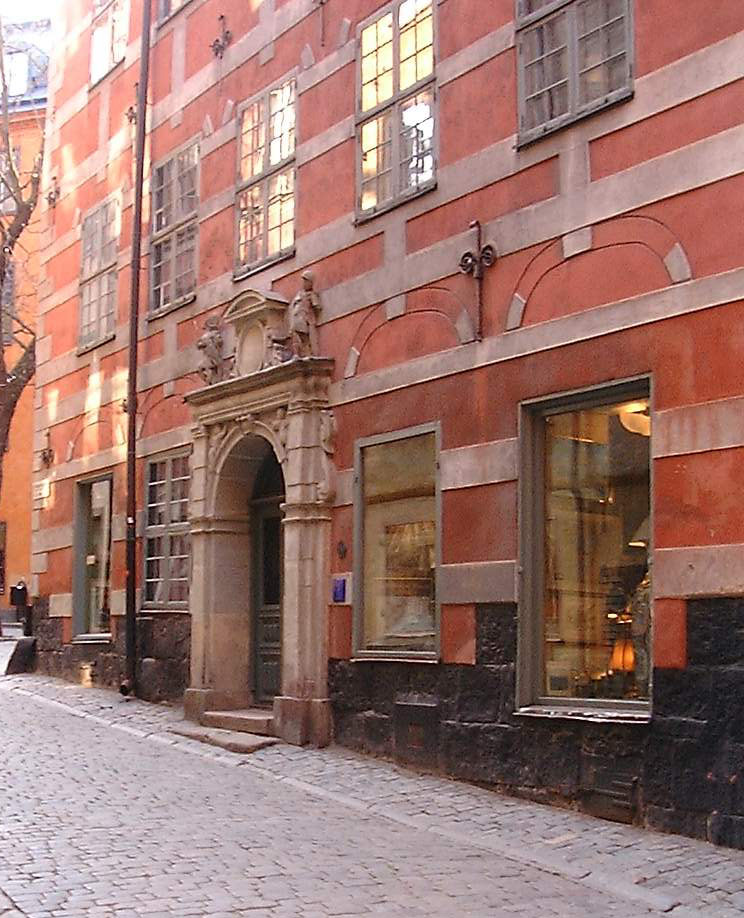
A façade of the Cepheus block facing Själagårdsgatan.

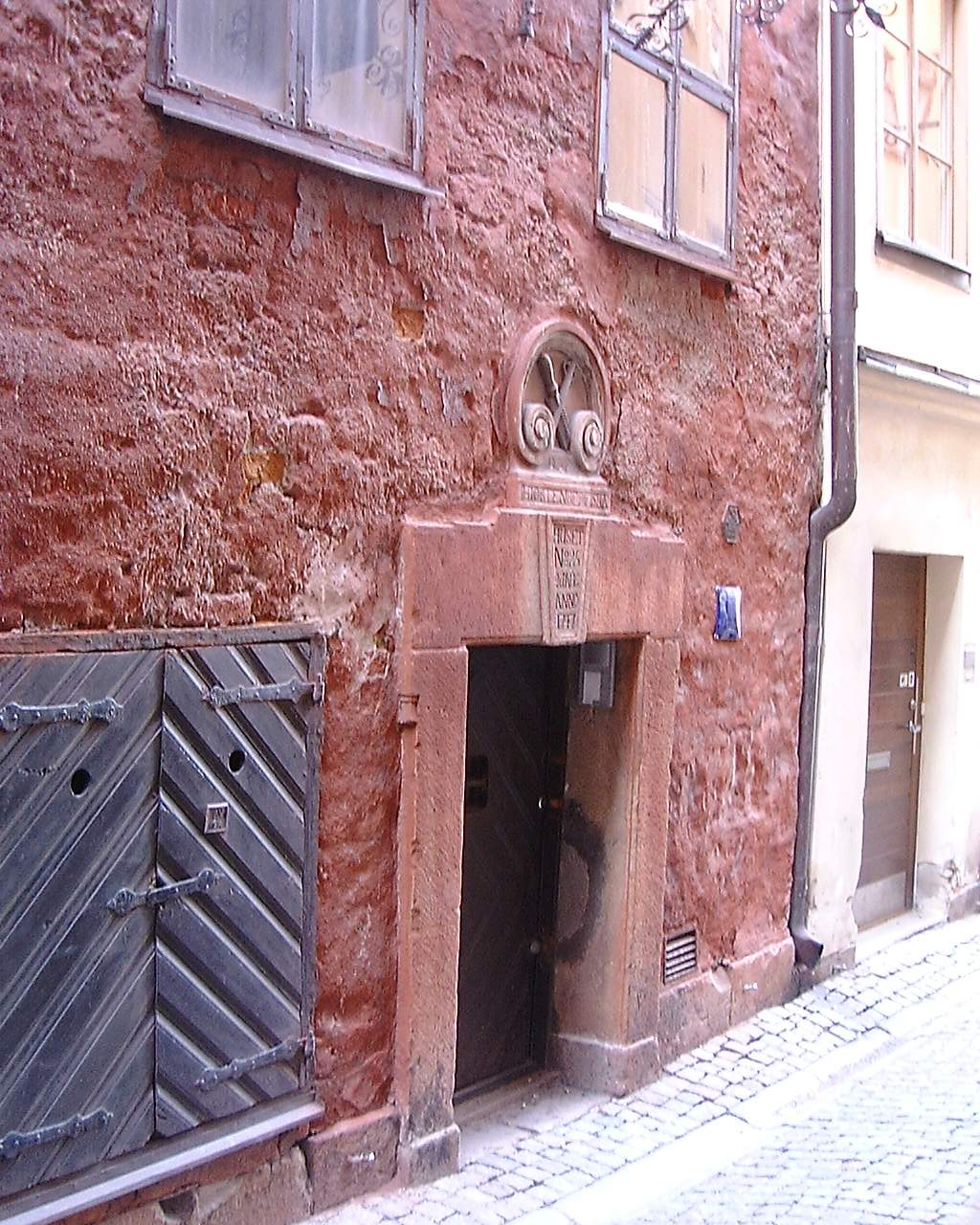
The door of Vindragarlaget hus at 6, Stora Hoparegränd with one of the blue signs offering information about historical buildings.

Samfundet S:t Erik (Swedish for "The St. Erik Association") is a Swedish non-profit organisation with the stated mission to promote knowledge of the history of Stockholm and support the preservation and development of the city's culture and aesthetics. Named after St. Eric, patron saint of Stockholm, the headquarters of the association is found on 5, Köpmangatan in Stockholm Old Town where a small boutique offers books and merchandise related to the history of the city. The association is a friend organisation of the Stockholm City Museum and the Museum of Medieval Stockholm.

== Activities ==
The association offers lectures and debates attended by prominent Stockholm-connoisseurs and it organises visits and excursions to addresses and locations normally unavailable to the general public. Besides regular lobbying, the association supports research and literature related to Stockholm.

Since 1903 it annually publishes St Eriks årsbok ("Yearbook of St. Eric") and since 1993 it has added blue signs to dozens of cultural heritage structures in Stockholm detailing the historical significance of these structures.

The organisation is receiving no state or municipal funding and is dependent of donations.

=== Award ===
Since 1963, the association annually gives an award to a person who, in the association's spirit, has performed praiseworthy achievements in science, art, journalism or culture. Previous recipients include among others Municipal commissioner (Borgarråd) Yngve Larsson (1966), architect Ivar Tengbom (1967), and writers Per Anders Fogelström (1969), Stig Claesson (1986), Lars Gyllensten (1995), Per Wästberg and professor Peter Schantz (2016).

== History ==
Itself founded in 1901, the association is the oldest organisation to promote the preservation of historical structures in Stockholm. It co-founded the Stockholm Beauty Council (Stockholms skönhetsråd) in 1918 and the Stockholm City Museum in 1937.

From 1934 and onwards, the association has restored several properties in the block named Cepheus in Stockholm Old Town. It founded the public housing company AB Stadsholmen ("Stadsholmen Ltd") in 1936, controlled by the city. It bought a property named Vindragarlagets härbärge ("Hostel of the Wine Puller Team") in 1923 – a building featuring a medieval stepped gable – and donated it to the city in 2006. In 1992 it acquired Stuckatörens hus ("House of the Plasterer"), a well-preserved upper class flat from the 1880s on 10, David Bagares Gata, a property donated to the city.

== See also ==
- History of Stockholm
