= Myopathic gait =

- Specialty: Neurology
- Causes: weakness of the proximal muscles of the pelvic girdle

Myopathic gait (or waddling gait) is a form of gait abnormality.

The "waddling" is due to the weakness of the proximal muscles of the pelvic girdle.

The patient uses circumduction to compensate for gluteal weakness.

Conditions associated with a myopathic gait include pregnancy, congenital hip dysplasia, muscular dystrophies and spinal muscular atrophy.

== See also ==
- Myopathy
