= Swedish School of Sport and Health Sciences =

University college in Stockholm, Sweden

Coordinates: 59°20′50″N 18°04′48″E

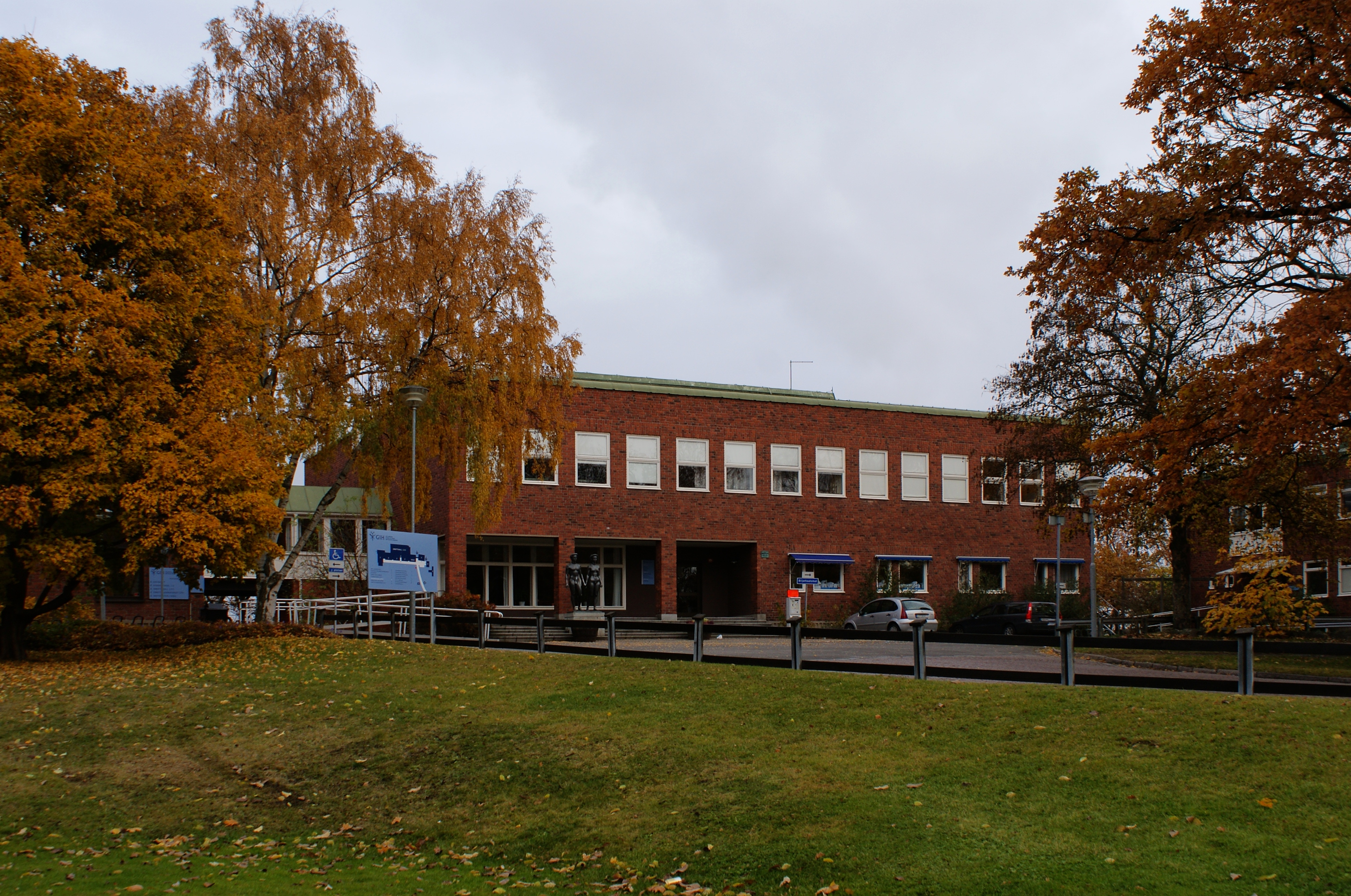
Main entrance

The Swedish School of Sport and Health Sciences (Swedish: Gymnastik- och idrottshögskolan, GIH) in Stockholm is a Swedish institution offering higher education in the fields of teaching profession in Physical Education, Sports coaching and Preventive health. The school offers both programmes and courses. It was founded as the Royal Central Gymnastics Institute (Swedish: Kungliga Gymnastiska Centralinstitutet, GCI) in 1813 by Per Henrik Ling, which makes it the oldest university college in the world within the field of human movement sciences.
