= Incremental exercise =

Exercise of increasing intensity over time

Incremental exercise is physical exercise that increases in intensity over time.

An incremental exercise test (IET) is a physical fitness test that varies by different variables. These include the initial starting rate, the consecutive work rates, increments and the duration of each increment. These variables can be modified extensively to suit the purpose of the training program or the individual. Incremental exercise is a widely accepted method of sourcing health-related information.

Incremental exercise is often used during fitness tests such as the YMCA sub-maximal test, YoYo test and the commonly known beep test. Multiple methods of incremental exercise tests have also proved useful in identifying and monitoring individuals' or teams' adaptation to training. Incremental exercise has proved to be useful for determining the simplest of factors, such as an individual's adaptation to a training program or physical fitness level, or some of the most complex factors. The exercise method is utilised in health studies to determine various health-related propositions and results. These include determining the reproducibility of the lower limbs activity level and, for clinical purposes, determining patient's anaerobic exercise responses and difficulties of daily living.

In a medical setting, three incremental exercise tests are commonly used: cardiac stress testing, cardiopulmonary exercise test, and an exercise test to detect exercise-induced asthma.

== Physiological effects ==
When people are involved in incremental exercise, at a specific intensity level of 70% and 75% VO_{2} max, they are performing at a greater rate than what they would be during a 30-minute submaximal constant load test. The intensity levels differ between incremental and submaximal constant exercise, and the benefits are not identical. The results suggest the physiological effects of incremental exercise can be more predominant than that of a submaximal constant load.

=== Contributions of the energy systems ===
One study found that the aerobic systems are predominant throughout an incremental exercise test (IET), accounting for about 86%-95% of energy systems at work. Glycolytic systems only accounted for 5%-14%, which can be concluded as a non-dominant energy system used during an IET.

=== Ventilation threshold ===
During incremental exercise the behaviour of the body's ventilation system increases. Incremental exercise is frequently prescribed to the elderly and elite athletes, specifically the first ventilation threshold (VT1) for the elderly and the second ventilation threshold (VT2) for elite athletes.

VT is the point of transition between predominantly aerobic energy production to anaerobic energy production. The thresholds reflect the heart rates so as it makes the difficulty of the exercise sensible to participants.

== Methods and training plans ==
There are various methods of incremental exercise that determine and improve physical fitness sequentially. Those of which include fitness tests such as the YMCA sub-maximal test, YoYo test, Leger test, and Beep test.

Incremental exercise is also a prominent method utilised in determining results of exercise intensity. A type of incremental exercise test that assists in determining the intensity of exercise includes the talk test (TT). The talk test is a sub-maximal, incremental exercise test which allows individuals to recognise their exercise training intensity. The self-administered test allows individuals the ability to determine if they are exercising at the appropriate heart rate and intensity level based on their ability to speak comfortably whilst exercising. The method of measuring exercise intensity is also a good indication of when individuals are putting too much stress on the body and need to reduce intensity level. This method of incremental exercise suggests the appropriate intensity is achieved if an individual can have light conversation while exercising. If the individual's speech begins to break or it becomes difficult to continue conversation, it is an indication the individual is overworking and needs to decrease the intensity level.
