= Keith Kelley (scientist) =

American immunophysiologist, researcher and academic

Keith Kelley (born November 5, 1947) is an American immunophysiologist, researcher and academic. He is Professor Emeritus of Immunophysiology at the University of Illinois Urbana–Champaign whose research focused on interactions between the immune, nervous and endocrine systems. In 2011, he was elected a Fellow of the American Association for the Advancement of Science (AAAS).

He has served as the second editor-in-chief of the journal Brain, Behavior, and Immunity and founding Managing Associate Editor of Brain, Behavior, and Immunity Integrative.

== Early life and education ==
He was born in Bloomington, Illinois. He received a Bachelor of Science degree from Illinois State University in 1969. Following graduation, he was drafted into the United States Army and served fourteen months with a field artillery fire direction control unit near Nha Trang during the Vietnam War.

After completing military service in 1971, Kelley enrolled at the University of Illinois Urbana–Champaign, where he earned a Master of Science degree in 1973 and a Doctor of Philosophy degree in 1976.

== Career and research ==
Kelley joined the faculty of Washington State University. Following a sabbatical at France’s Institut National de la Recherche Agronomique, he joined the University of Illinois Urbana–Champaign as a professor in 1984.

Kelley's early research questioned the prevailing conception of the immune system as functionally independent of the central nervous system, contributing to an emerging understanding of neuroimmune interactions. His laboratory demonstrated that hormones released during physiological stress alter immune function, while immune-derived cytokines transmit signals to the brain and influence neuroendocrine activity and behavior. These findings contributed to the emergence of psychoneuroimmunology as a multidisciplinary field linking neuroscience, immunology and endocrinology.

In 2003, Kelley succeeded Robert Ader as the second editor-in-chief of Brain, Behavior, and Immunity, the official journal of the Psychoneuroimmunology Research Society.

Kelley retired from the University of Illinois in 2011 and was subsequently named Professor Emeritus. Following his retirement, he continued to collaborate with international research groups at Shenzhen University in China and VinUniversity in Hanoi, Vietnam.

His research has focused on the bidirectional communication between the immune system and the central nervous system. He helped demonstrate that the nervous, endocrine and immune systems communicate continuously through hormones, cytokines and neural pathways.

His later work examined neuroimmune mechanisms underlying depression, neurodegeneration and other psychiatric disorders. Reviews co-authored by Kelley synthesized evidence linking chronic inflammation with behavioral and cognitive disorders and have become among the most highly cited publications in psychoneuroimmunology.

In 2023, Kelley became the founding Managing Associate Editor of Brain, Behavior, and Immunity Integrative, an Elsevier journal.

== Awards ==
In 1987, he received the National Animal Management Award, American Society of Animal Science, sponsored by Merck Research Laboratories. In 2003, he received the Norman Cousins Award from the Psychoneuroimmunology Research Society.
