= Payson R. Stevens =

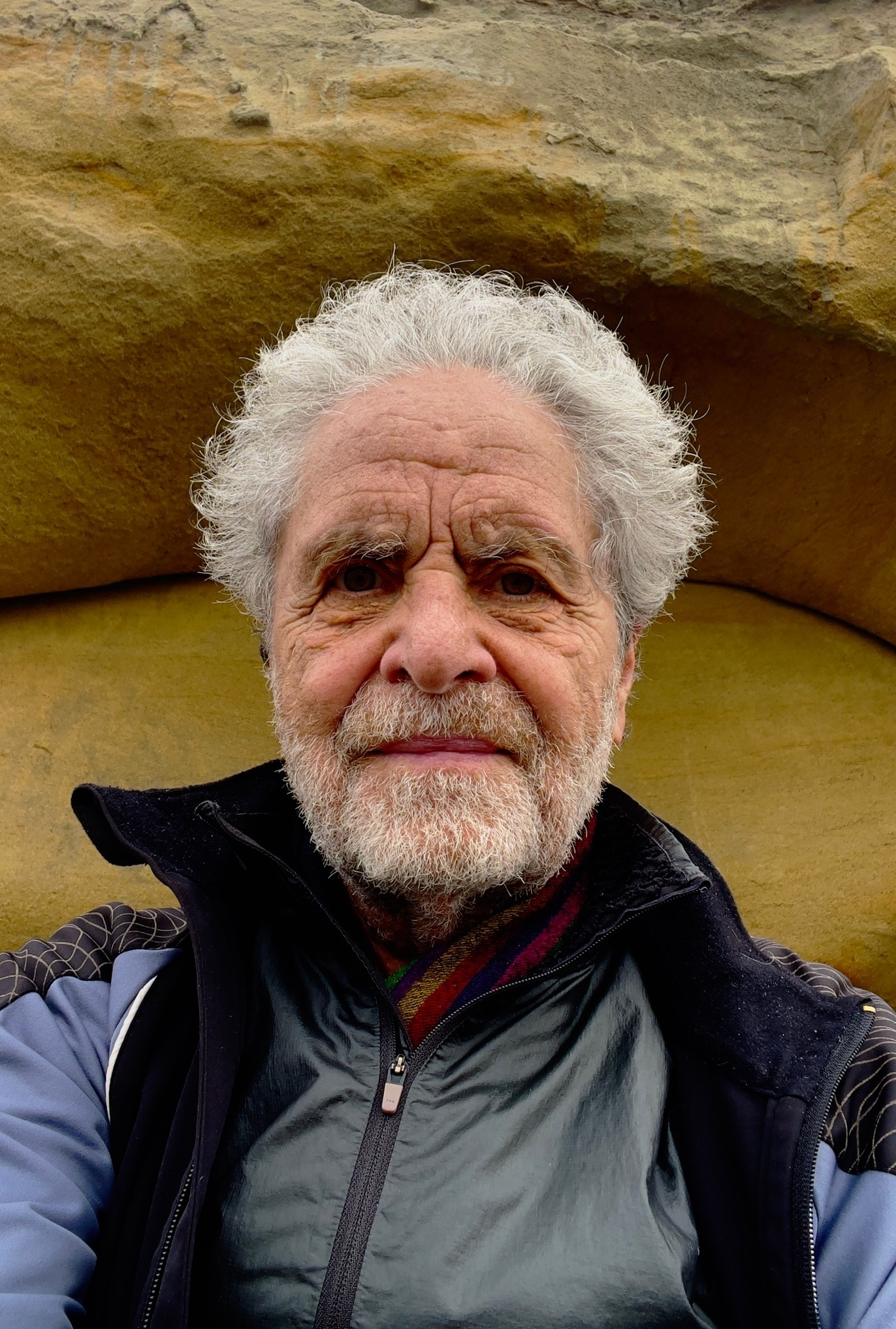
- Born: 29 March 1945 (age 81)
- Education: New York University; City University of New York; Scripps Institution of Oceanography
- Occupations: Science communicator, artist, writer, environmentalist, filmmaker
- Years active: 1970 onwards
- Known for: Science communication in earth system science; Nature conservation in the United States and India; Art and poetry
- Notable work: Biology Today (1971); Geology Today (1973); Antarctica: Desert of Ice, Sea of Life (1979); Embracing Earth: New views of our changing planet (1992); Meshuggenary: Celebrating the world of Yiddish (2002)
- Spouse: Kamla K. Kapur
- Website: https://www.paysonrstevens.com/ https://energylandscapes.com

Payson R. Stevens (born March 29, 1945) is an artist, writer, environmentalist, filmmaker, and science communicator from the United States. Stevens is regarded as a pioneer of science communication in the fields of earth systems science (ESS) and climate change in the U.S. He is also noted as an early digital and electronic visual artist, a painter, and a poet. In addition, he is known for his environmental and humanitarian work in California, US, and Himachal Pradesh, India.

== Personal life and education ==
Payson R. Stevens was born to Dr. Naomi Miller Coval-Apel, a noted New York dentist, and Eric Stevens.

Stevens has a background in the arts, molecular biology, biological oceanography, and graphic design. He has a BA from New York University. He studied molecular biology for his masters at the City University of New York from 1965 to 1968. He also studied at the Arts Students League and the School of Visual Arts in New York City. Later, Stevens completed some graduate work at the Scripps Institution of Oceanography, under the guidance of Roger Revelle.

Stevens is married to the Indian writer Kamla K. Kapur. They live in Del Mar, San Diego County, California.

== Science communication ==
Stevens was a contributing consultant to the college textbooks Biology Today and Geology Today, published by CRM in 1972 and 1973 respectively. Stevens was the writer for the documentary 'Antarctica: Desert of Ice, Sea of Life', which was broadcast by KPBS on November 19, 1979. This documentary won the CINE Golden Eagle Award and the 1980 Silver Award at the U.S. Industrial Film Festival.

In 1979, Stevens founded the company InterNetwork Inc. (INI) 'to provide to provide communication services to organizations wanting to convey scientific information to broader, lay audiences using a variety of media'. In 1985, the Earth Science Systems Committee of NASA reached out to Stevens for help in engaging non-technical audiences, such as bureaucrats, politicians, and the general public, with the then nascent discipline of ESS. Stevens and his company INI prepared ESS material and a strategy to promote them. Some of the ESS topics Stevens/INI helped design and illustrate materials for included an introduction to ESS, climate change, space missions for oceanographic data, El Nino, and the ozone layer. The techniques used in these materials and promotional strategy were more often associated with corporate marketing.

Later in the 1990s, InterNetwork Inc. evolved into a new company, called InterNetwork Media Inc.

=== Reception ===
According to the historian of science Jenifer Barton, 'Payson Stevens's work helped transform ESS's products and various communication strategies into a science brand'. Similar arguments about the significance of Stevens's work for ESS also appear in an interview of the earth scientist Berrien Moore III (2011), and in the Encyclopedia of Ocean Sciences (2008).

In 1989, Stevens presented the work of INI at Robert Redford's 'Sundance Symposium on Global Climate Change'.

In 1990, Stevens delivered a TED talk on global warming.

In 1993, Stevens's company INI received the John Wesley Powell Award from the United States Geological Survey.

In 1994, INI went on to receive the Presidential Award for Design Excellence from President Bill Clinton.

== Nature conservation ==
In the late 1970s, Stevens was involved in the public efforts to get certain tracts, marked for offshore oil drilling in the Outer Continental Shelf near San Diego, California, deleted on environmental grounds.

In 2000, the volunteer group 'Friends of GHNP' was founded by Stevens and Sanjeeva Pandey, an Indian Forest Service officer who was then the director of the Great Himalayan National Park (GHNP), located in the north Indian state of Himachal Pradesh. Stevens was a key player in Friends of GHNP, which put together the nomination dossier and spearheaded the application for a UNESCO World Heritage Site status for the Great Himalayan National Park (GHNP) in Himachal Pradesh, India. In June 2014, GHNP became a UNESCO World Heritage Site.

Since 2021, Stevens has been involved in the public efforts to protect the bluffs and beach in Del Mar, California, along the Pacific Ocean.

== Science-imagination interface ==
- Stevens is a Fellow of the Arthur C. Clark Centre for Human Imagination at the University of California, San Diego.

== Humanitarian work ==
Stevens was a founding member and board advisor of the non-governmental organization (NGO) 'My Himachal', formed in 2006. This NGO trained rural women as healthcare workers, organized traveling health fairs, and instituted a small education fund, all in a remote part of Himachal Pradesh, India. For this work, Stevens was honored in 2008 by Project Concern International.

== Artwork ==
- In the 1960s, Stevens was a part of the Bread and Puppet Theatre in New York City.
- In 1983, his computer art titled 'Entropy' was featured at the SIGGRAPH 1983: Art Show in Detroit, Michigan.
- In October 2006, Roerich Memorial Museum and Art Gallery in Naggar, India, hosted an exhibition of Stevens's paintings, titled 'Flux and Flow'.
- In July 2007, Stevens's paintings were exhibited alongside those of Lotte Koch and Nele von Mengerhausen in the exhibition 'Alles im Fluss', at Tannerhof in Bayerischzell, Germany.
- In October 2007, the Government Museum and Art Gallery at Chandigarh, India, hosted an exhibition of Stevens's paintings, titled 'Energy Flows'. The paintings were based on the themes of the energy of flowing water, and the flows of the human soul through life and death.
- On August 3, 2008, Doordarshan, India's public service broadcaster, featured Steven's art and life in the Indian Himalayas, in a short film titled 'Energy Landscapes - The Art of Payson R. Stevens'.
- In February 2009, at the San Diego Museum of Art in California, Stevens gave a talk and showed a documentary he had made on the ancient Tabo monastery in Spiti valley, India, where he had been trapped with his wife for two weeks due to sudden snows in September 2008.
- In September 2009, the American Centre of the US Embassy in New Delhi, India, hosted an exhibition of Stevens's paintings, titled 'Dark Forest/Ghana Jungle'. The paintings were based on his reflections on the energy flows in deep, dark forests.
- In February 2010, the Southwestern College Art Gallery in Chula Vista, California, hosted an exhibition of Stevens's artwork from the 1970s onwards, titled 'Energy Landscapes'. This exhibition showcased Stevens's paintings, drawings, computer generated graphics, books and posters, and his work from InterActive Media.
- In 2015, Stevens's video poem 'Ajanta: Small Universe' was an Official Selection in the Delhi International Film Festival, India. In the same year, his video poem 'Entropic Void' was featured on movingpoems.com.
- In 2015 and 2016, Stevens presented his video poems at the San Diego Museum of Art, California.
- In October 2016, Stevens's video poem 'Divine Spell' featured at the London International Short Film Festival.
- In 2017, four video poems by Stevens appeared in Atticus Review.

== Bibliography ==
- Stevens, P.R. 1979. OCS Drilling Process: San Diego Closses Ranks. Oceans, 4, pages 57–60.
- Bailey, K.M., Francis, R.C. and Stevens, P.R., 1982. The life history and fishery of Pacific whiting, Merluccius productus. Northwest and Alaska Fisheries Centre.
- Bernstein, R.L. and Stevens, P.R., 1986. Ocean remote sensing. Space science and applications: Progress and potential (A 87-30876 12-12). New York, IEEE Press, pp. 123–131.
- Stevens, P.R. and Kelley, K.W., 1992. Embracing Earth: New views of our changing planet. San Francisco: Chronicle Books.
- Stevens, P.R. and Steinmetz, S., 2002. Meshuggenary: Celebrating the world of Yiddish. Simon and Schuster.
- Stevens, P.R. 2010. You in the World. Tarang Press.
- Stevens, P.R. 2015. The World in You. Tarang Press.
- Stevens, P.R. 2026. Before AI Decides: Nine Ways to Stay Human. Tarang Press.
- Stevens, P.R. 2026. The Wisdom of the Azheimer's Sage: A Son's Journey Through Caregiving, Identity, and Spiritual Transformation. Park Street Press.
- Stevens, P.R. 2026. Covert Cognitive Selection: Divergent Evolution and the Fourth Mode of Selection in AI-Mediated Systems. SSRN Working Paper.

== Alzheimer’s Sage ==
A Son’s Journey Through Caregiving,

Identity, and Spiritual Transformation
