= Antique =

Item having value because of its age

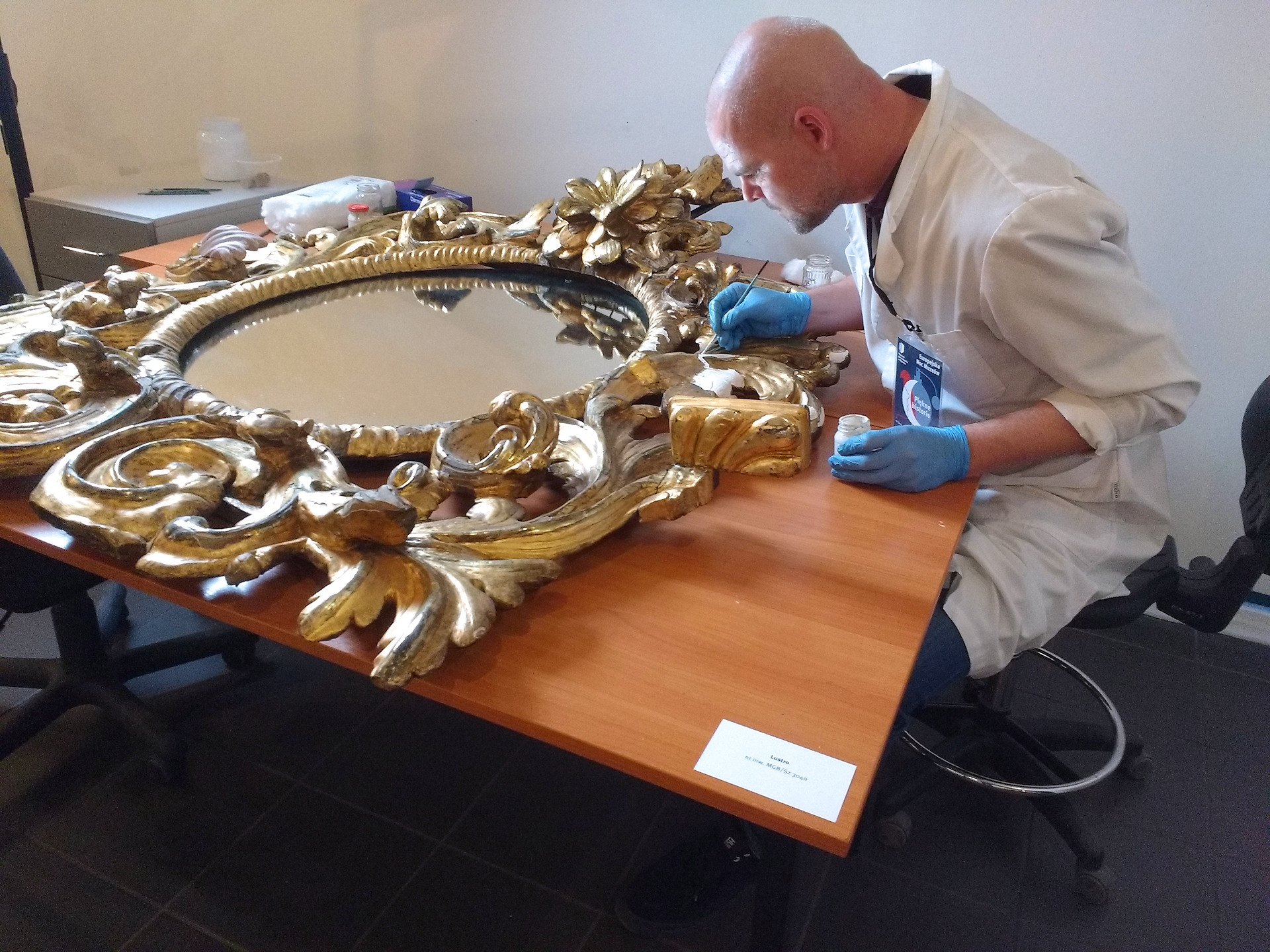
Restoring the frame of an antique mirror at the Upper Silesian Museum in Bytom, Poland

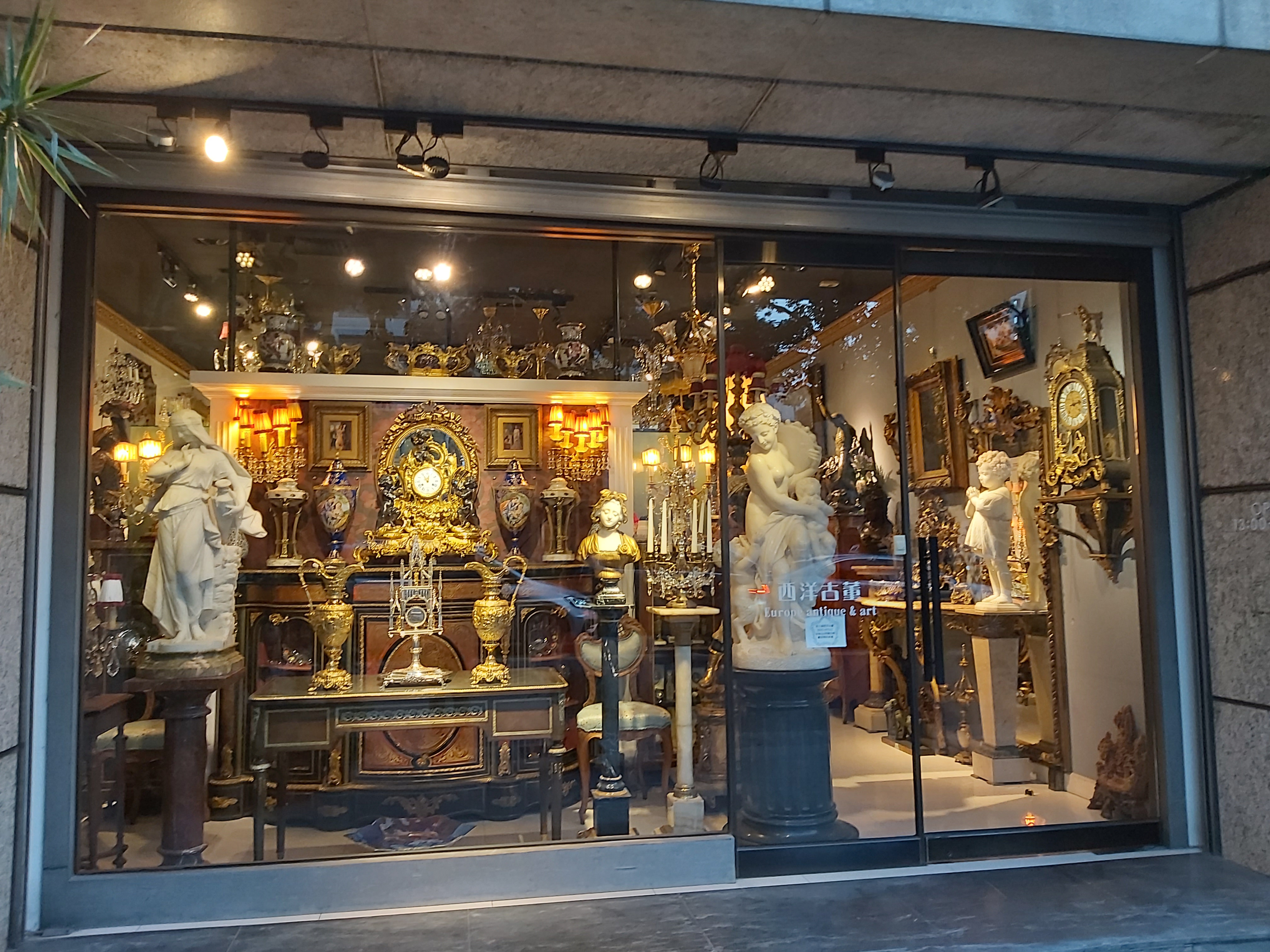
An antique shop in Da'an District, Taipei, Taiwan

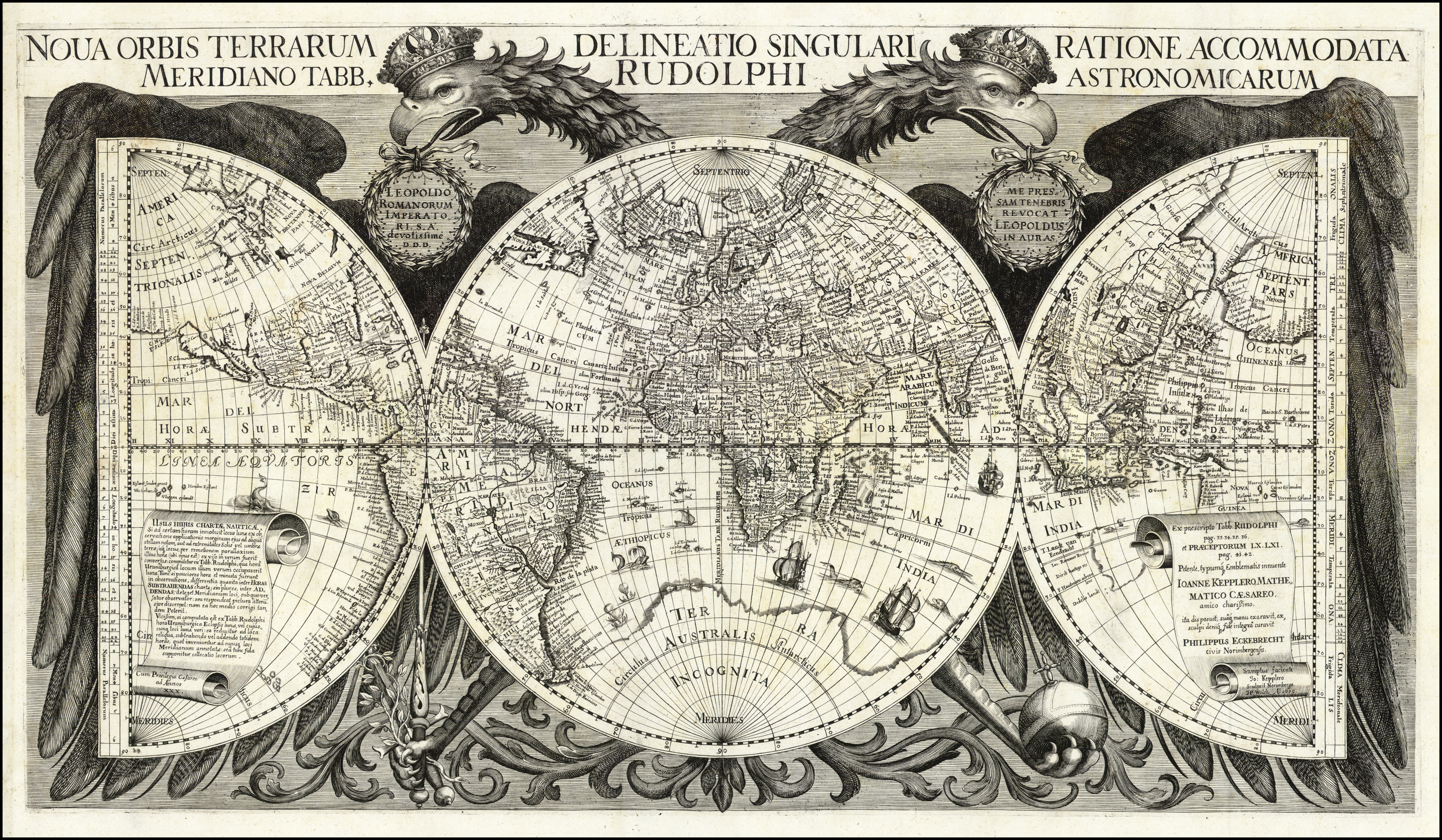
An antique map

An antique (from Latin antiquus 'old, ancient') is an item perceived as having value because of its aesthetic or historical significance, and often defined as at least 100 years old (or some other limit), although the term is often used loosely to describe any object that is old. An antique is usually an item that is collected or desirable because of its age, beauty, rarity, condition, utility, personal emotional connection, or other unique features. It is an object that represents a previous era or time period in human history. Vintage and collectible are used to describe items that are old, but do not meet the 100-year criterion.

Antiques are usually objects of the decorative arts that show some degree of craftsmanship, collectability, or an attention to design, such as a desk or an early automobile. They are bought at antique shops, estate sales, auction houses, online auctions and other venues, or estate inherited. Antiques dealers often belong to national trade associations, many of which belong to CINOA, a confederation of art and antique associations across 21 countries that represents 5,000 dealers.

== Definition ==
The common definition of antique is a collectible object such as a piece of furniture or work of art that has an enhanced value because of its considerable age, but it varies depending on the item, its source, the year of its creation, etc. The customary definition of antique requires that an item should be at least 100 years old and in original condition. (Motor vehicles are an exception to this rule, with some definitions requiring an automobile to be as little as 25 years old to qualify as an antique.)

In the United States, the Smoot-Hawley Tariff Act (para.1811) exempted "...works of art (except rugs and carpets made after the year 1700), collections in illustration of the progress of the arts, works in bronze, marble, terra cotta, parian, pottery, or porcelain, artistic antiquities and objects of ornamental character or educational value which shall have been produced prior to the year 1830" (emphasis added). 1830 was the approximate beginning of mass production in the United States; at the time, 1930, it also marked an age of at least 100 years. These definitions were intended to allow people of that time to distinguish between genuine antique pieces, vintage items, and collectible objects.

In 1979, the British art critic Edward Lucie-Smith wrote that "Antique-dealers... sometimes insist that nothing is antique which was made after 1830, although the barrier has been broken down in recent years by the enthusiasm of collectors for Art Nouveau and Art Deco.

The alternative term, antiquities, commonly refers to the remains of ancient art and everyday items from antiquity, which themselves are often archaeological artifacts. An antiquarian is a person who collects and studies antiquities or things of the past.

=== China ===
Traditionally, Chinese antiques are marked by a red seal, known as a 'chop', placed there by an owner. Experts can identify previous owners of an antique by reading the chops. The pre-revolution Chinese government tried to assist collectors of Chinese antiques by requiring their Department of Antiquities to provide a governmental chop on the bottom of a Chinese antique. This chop is visible as a piece of red sealing wax that bears the government chop to verify the date of the antique. The government of the People's Republic of China has its own definitions of what it considers antique. As of the Cultural Revolution and China's opening trade to other countries, the government has tried to protect the definition of a Chinese antique.

== Antiquing ==
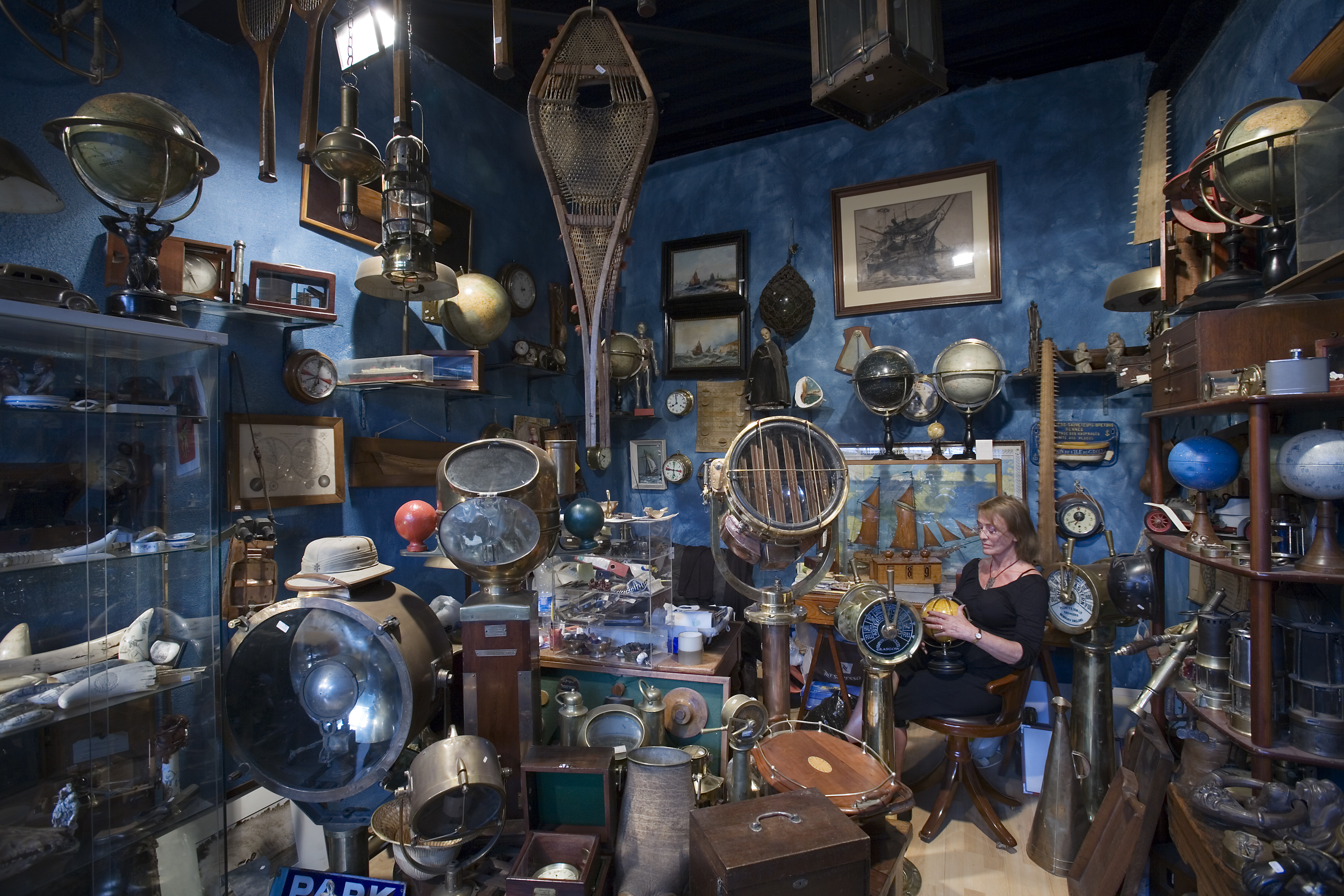
A vintage travel gear seller at Marché Dauphine, Saint-Ouen, Paris

Antiquing is the act of shopping, identifying, negotiating, or bargaining for antiques. People buy items for personal use, gifts, or profit. Sources for antiquing include garage sales and yard sales, estate sales, resort towns, antique districts, collectives, and international auction houses.

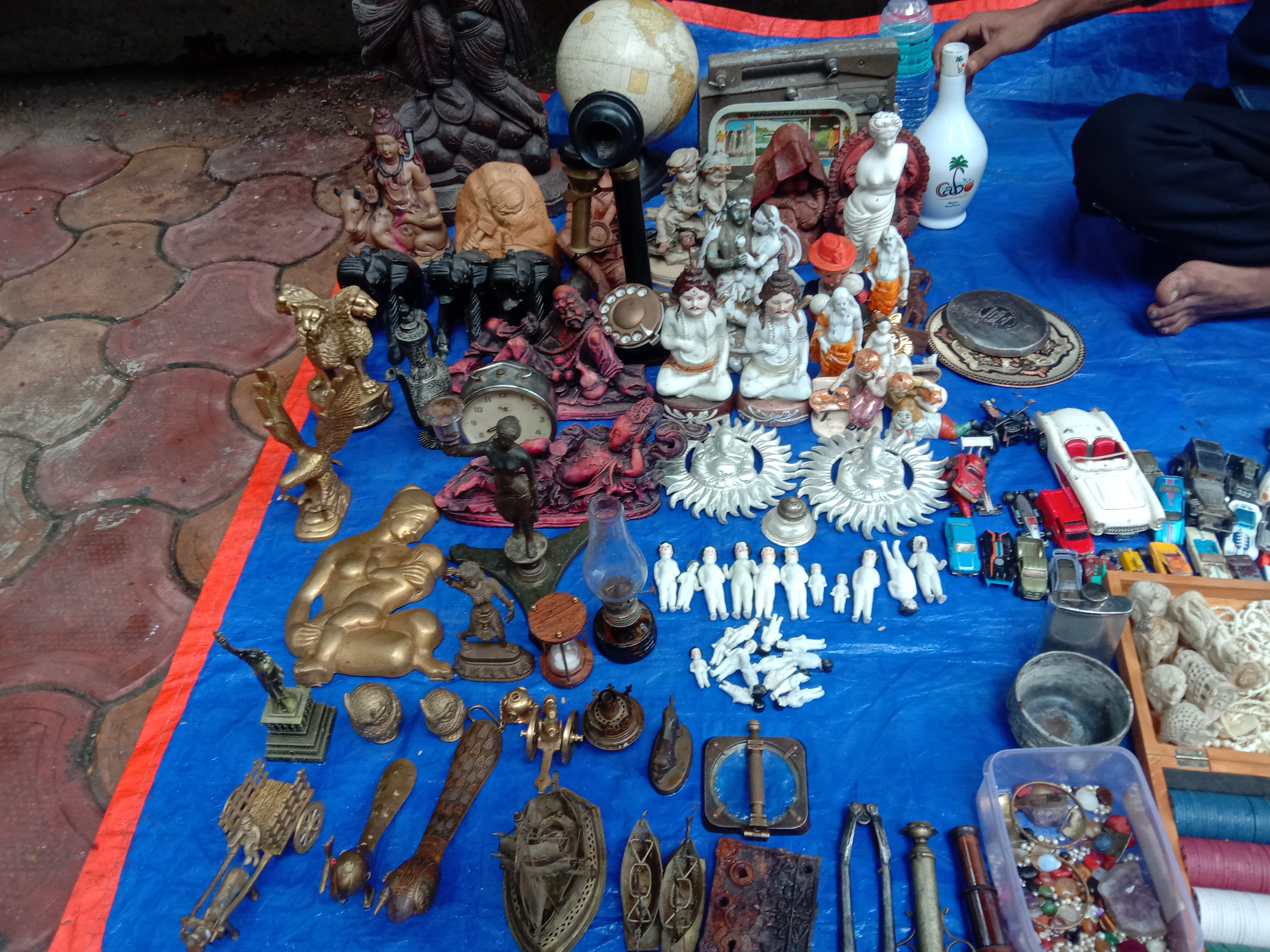
Antique items for sale at a roadside shop in Kolkata, India

Note that antiquing also means the craft of making an object appear antique through distressing or using antique-looking paint applications. Often, individuals get confused between these handmade distressed vintage or modern items and true antiques. Would-be antique collectors who are unaware of the differences may find themselves paying a high amount of money for something that would have little value if re-sold.

== Furniture ==
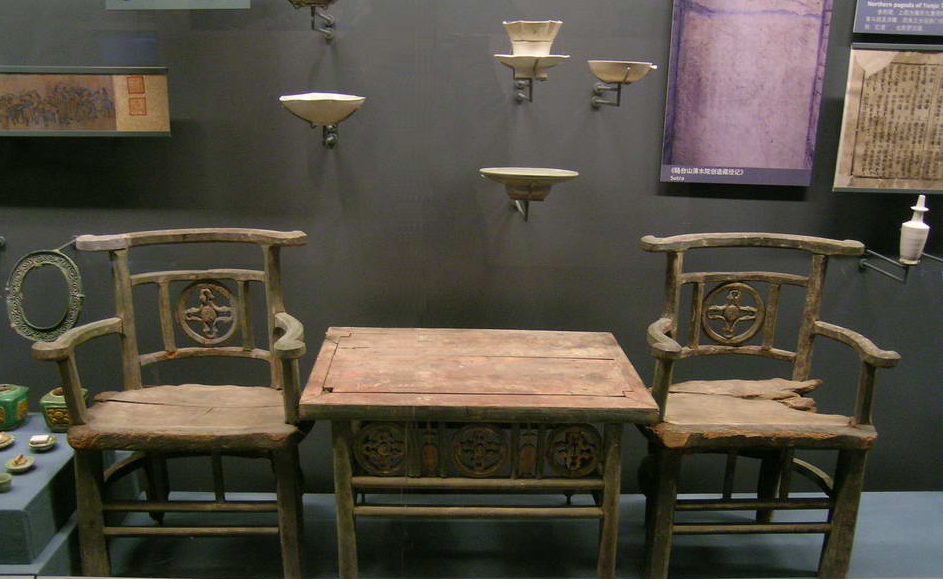
Furniture antiques from the Chinese Liao dynasty

Antique furniture is a popular area of antiques because furniture has obvious practical uses as well as collector value. Many collectors use antique furniture pieces in their homes, and care for them with the hope that the value of these items will remain the same or appreciate. This is in contrast to buying new furniture, which typically depreciates from the moment of purchase.

Antique furniture includes dining tables, chairs, bureaus, chests etc. The most common woods are mahogany, oak, pine, walnut, and rosewood. Chinese antique furniture is often made with elm, a wood common to many regions in Asia. Each wood has a distinctive grain and color. Many modern pieces of furniture use laminate or wood veneer to achieve the same effect. There are a number of different styles of antique furniture depending on when and where it was made. Some examples of stylistic periods are: Arts & Crafts, Georgian, Regency, and Victorian.

An important part of some antique furniture is its hardware fittings, the style of which varies from one period to another. For example, Victorian era hardware is different from other period hardware and is perceived to be aesthetically defined; this is the reason for its popularity.

== See also ==
- American Pickers
- Antiquarian book trade in the United States
- Antique tool
- Antiques restoration
- Antiques Roadshow
- Authentication
- Del Mar Antique Show
- Dolly Johnson Antique and Art Show
- List of antiques experts
- Primitive decorating, a style of decorating using antiques
- Relic
- The San Francisco Fall Antiques Show
- Vintage design
