= Primitive decorating =

Style of interior decorating

Primitive decorating is a style of decorating using primitive folk art style that is characteristic of a historic or early Americana time period, typically using elements with muted colors and a rough and simple look to them. Decorating in the primitive style can incorporate either true antiques or contemporary folk art. Contemporary primitive folk art is designed to have an old or antique look but created using new materials.

== Examples ==
Examples of antiquing techniques used by primitive folk artists include tea or coffee staining and sanding down paint to create a worn, aged look. The style is sometimes referred to as country style.

Primitive decorating often features a number of recurring themes and characters including primitive angels, barnstars, primitive crows, primitive dolls & rag dolls, saltbox houses, sheep, willow trees, primitive wooden signs, and pottery. Primitive design focuses on furniture made between the mid-18th century and the early 19th century by farmers.

A number of magazines specialize in primitive decorating.

== Gallery ==
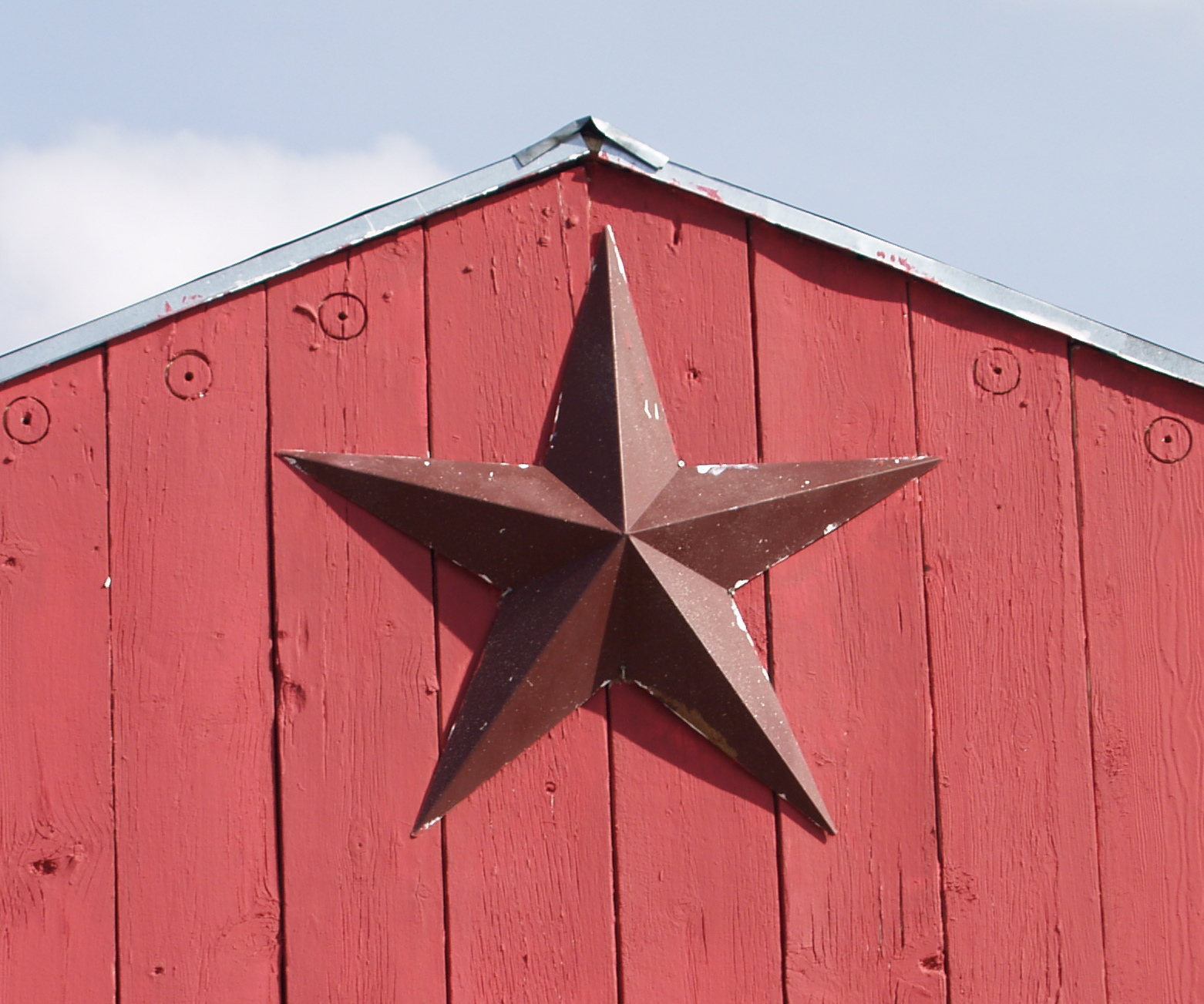
Barnstars are a common element of primitive decorating

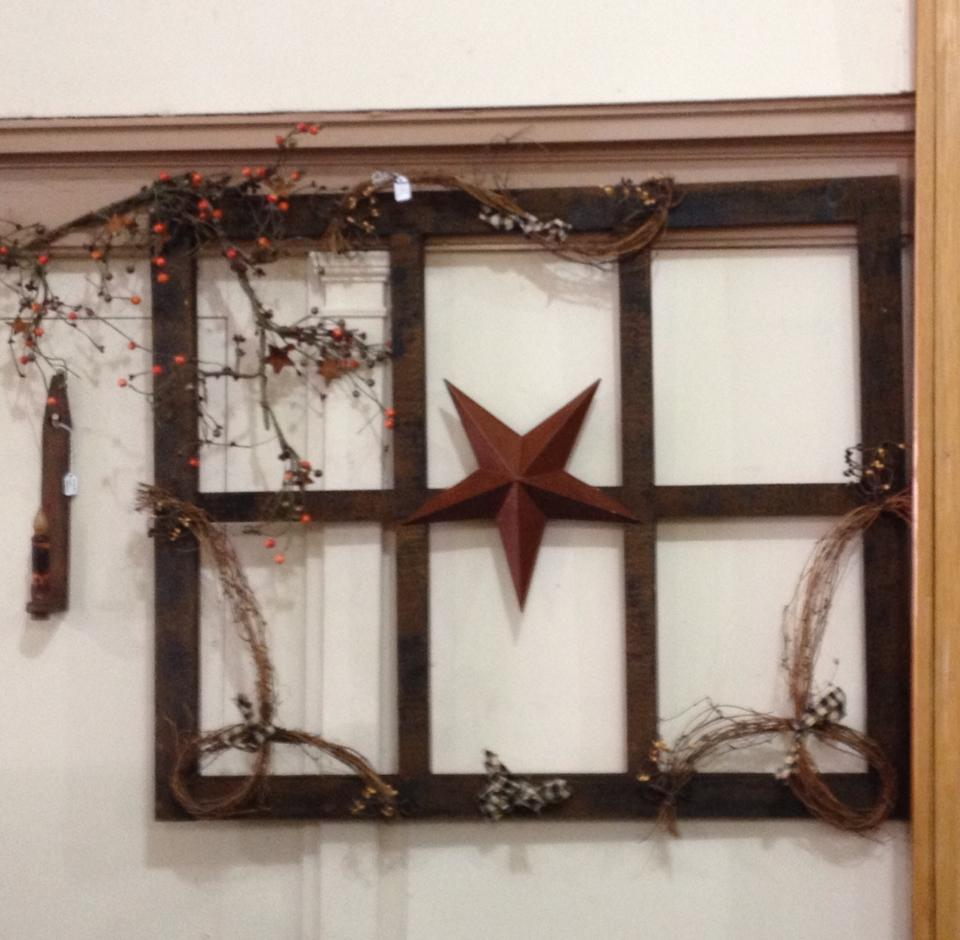
A primitive decoration created using an antique window frame, barn star and pip berry garland

== See also ==
- Country Living
- Interior design
