= Del Mar, California =

City in California, United States

- City
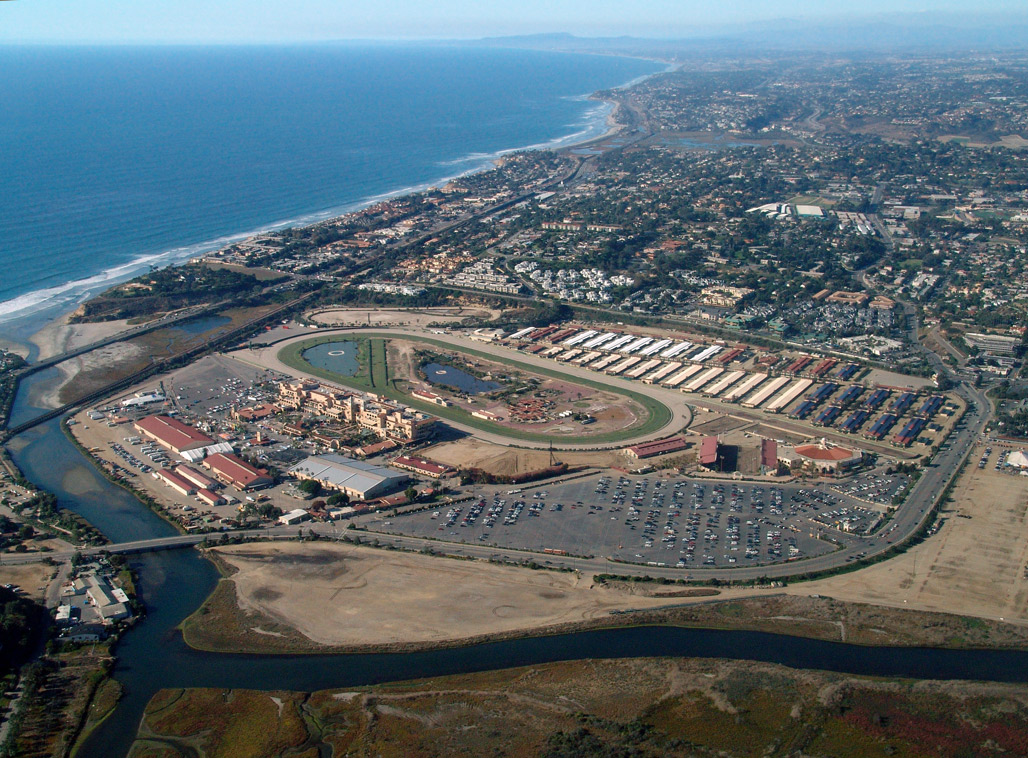
- The Del Mar racetrack

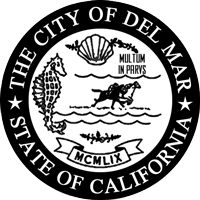
- Seal
- Interactive map of Del Mar, California
- Location in the contiguous United States
- Coordinates: 32°57′18″N 117°15′50″W
- Country: United States
- State: California
- County: San Diego
- Incorporated: July 15, 1959

Government
  - Body: City council
  - Mayor: Tracy Martinez

Area
  - City: 1.77 sq mi (4.59 km^{2})
  - Land: 1.72 sq mi (4.45 km^{2})
  - Water: 0.054 sq mi (0.14 km^{2}) 3.08%
- Elevation: 112 ft (34 m)

Population (2020)
  - City: 3,954
  - Density: 2,303.0/sq mi (889.19/km^{2})
  - Metro: SD-TJ: 5,105,768
- Time zone: UTC-8 (PST)
  - Summer (DST): UTC-7 (PDT)
- ZIP code: 92014
- Area code: 858
- FIPS code: 06-18506
- GNIS feature ID: 1656480
- Website: www.delmar.ca.us

Del Mar (Spanish pronunciation: [del ˈmaɾ]; Spanish for "Of the Sea") is a beach city in San Diego County, California, United States, located on the coast of the Pacific Ocean. It was established in 1885 to build a seaside resort. The annual San Diego County Fair has had a permanent home at the Del Mar Fairgrounds since 1936. Horse racing began at the fairgrounds racetrack the following year and is hosted every summer. The city incorporated in 1959 aiming to preserve its small town feel. Its population was 3,954 as of the 2020 census, down from 4,161 at the 2010 census.

== History ==
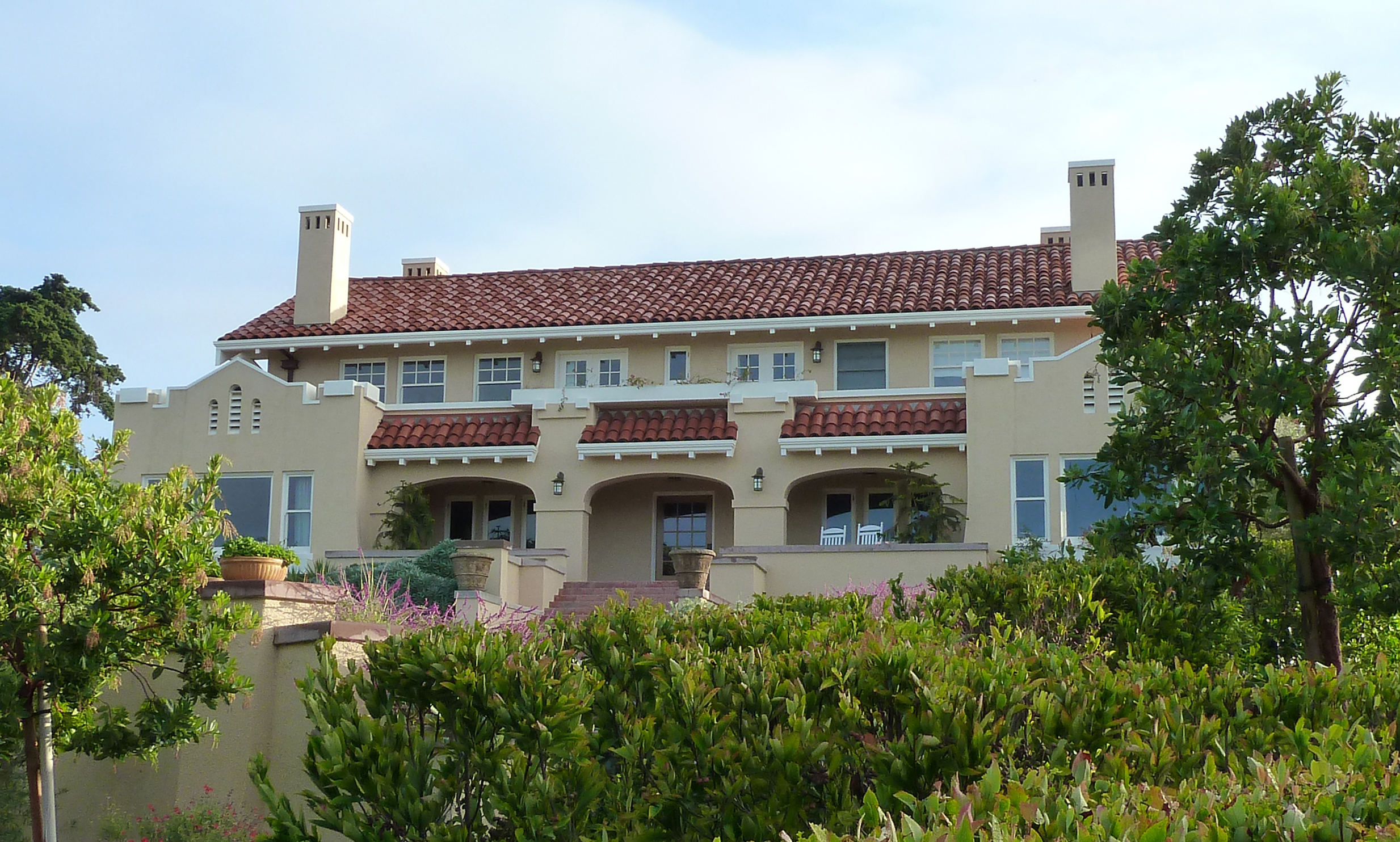
The historic Mission Revival style Canfield-Wright House

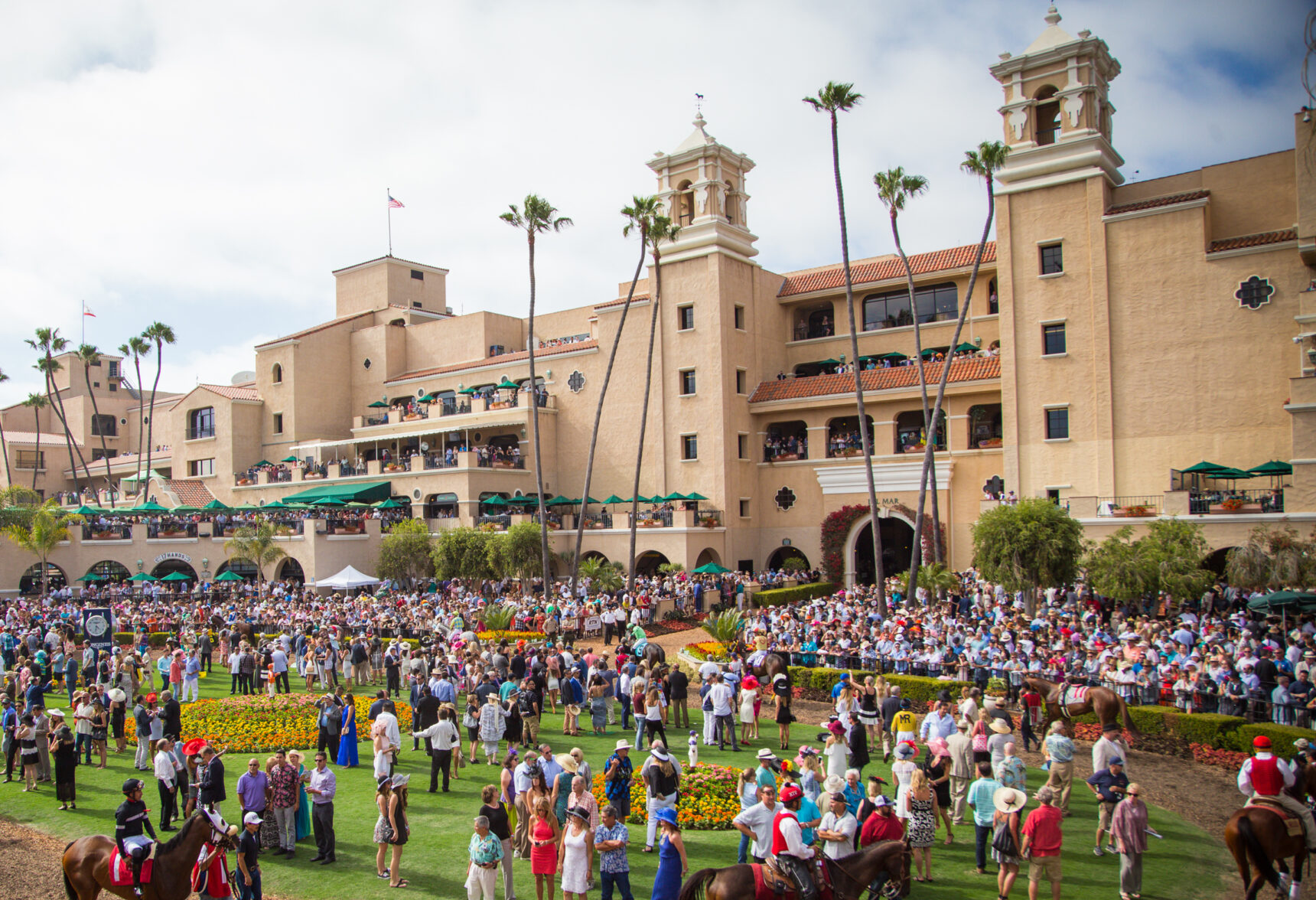
Del Mar Racetrack, founded in 1937.

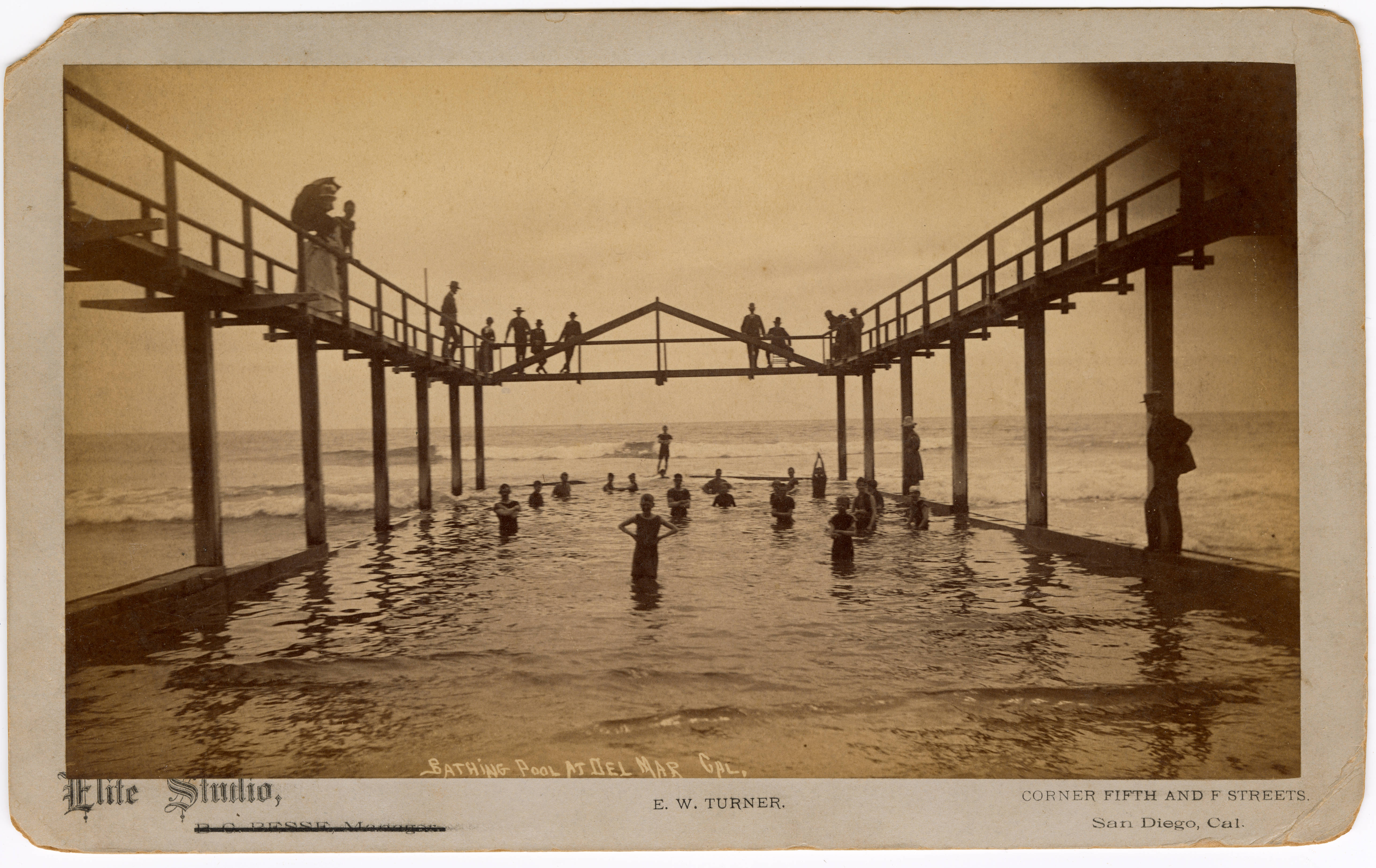
Bathing Pool at Del Mar

In 1880, the California Southern Railroad was formed to connect San Diego to the national rail network and Del Mar was along the planned route. It was first settled in 1882 by Theodore M. Loop, a railroad official from New York, and his wife Ella. Loop thought the area was "the most attractive place on the entire coast". Ella gave the site its name, inspired by Bayard Taylor's poem "The Fight of Paso del Mar". Instead of moving on when the railroad was completed, Loop decided he wanted to stay. In 1885, Loop met Colonel Jacob Taylor and proposed building a town together. Taylor was a prosperous rancher that had come to the region with his family. He had bought Rancho Santa Maria de Los Peñasquitos and intended to stay there. On seeing the beauty and development potential of the Del Mar area, he changed his plans. He purchased 338 acres (1.37 km^{2}) of land from Enoch Talbert, with visions of building a seaside resort for the rich and famous. He installed the first telephone line between Del Mar and Peñasquitos so he could manage his ranch while living on the coast and developing his resort. By 1888, there was a village of about 25 homes with what is now 10th Street as its main corridor. The city built the first dedicated school for the surrounding sparsely populated area, ending the practice of students being taught in barns. The town's development suffered a major setback when Taylor's hotel "Casa del Mar" burned to the ground due to a kitchen fire the following year. Flooding in Southern California had damaged roads, bridges, and railroad tracks causing widespread devastation and leaving Del Mar isolated. San Diego's population fell in half from its 1887 peak by 1890. Despite Taylor's initial pledge to rebuild, he was not only unable to complete the project, he lost his ranch in the subsequent recession and left California. Development stalled and the city closed the century with a population of fewer than a hundred people.

In 1905, the South Coast Land Company acquired all of Taylor's land. They hired Ed Fletcher, who later became a State Senator, to subdivide the land and lay out a road system. They hired John C. Austin, one of Los Angeles' most prominent architects, to revive Taylor's hotel site for their first building in Del Mar. The hotel site became the Stratford Inn and was completed around 1910. Austin was from Oxfordshire, England near William Shakespeare's home of Stratford-upon-Avon. The hotel name and its Tudor Revival architecture style were meant to evoke Shakespeare's home and era.

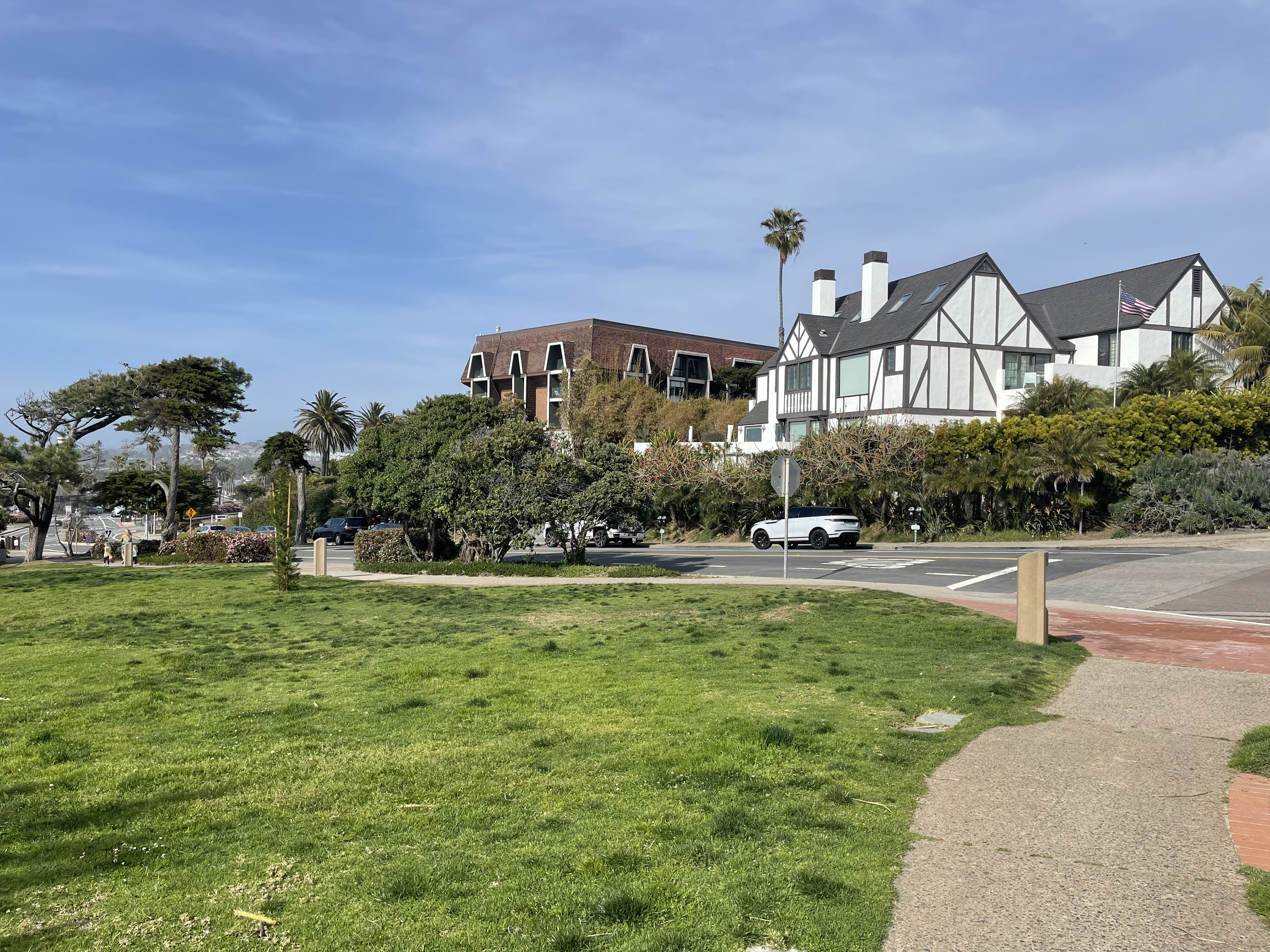
A restored historic Tudor Revival style home by Sea Grove Park

Shakespeare was important to the Hollywood silent film stars the South Coast Land Company wanted to attract. Around a quarter of silent films were adaptations of Shakespeare's work. The hotel and town quickly became a favorite of Hollywood stars. Del Mar's first retail center, now called Stratford Square, was built in 1927 across the street using a similar style. Additional Tudor style homes and around a dozen commercial buildings were built and it became a unique and distinctive feature of Old Del Mar. It contrasted with the dominant style of the region, which had become Spanish Colonial Revival. The style had started replacing others after being featured at the Panama–California Exposition as suited to the regional climate. At close of the silent film era, Los Angeles Times Sports editor Pawl Lowry observed that, "Del Mar has class written all over it ... Del Mar has the Spanish touch of Old California, the artistic, aristocratic air of the day of the Dons. The buildings are in keeping from stern to stern."

The United States Navy established an emergency use airfield in Del Mar in the 1920s. Del Mar was not unaffected by the Great Depression of the 1930s, with home building temporarily coming to a halt. In 1933, James E. Franks and Ed Fletcher suggested the land next to the airfield be turned into a permanent home for the San Diego County Fair. It had a golf course and riding stable that were failing financially, as leisure spending greatly declined during the depression. A county agricultural district was able to secure a state grant to purchase the land and the first fair was held in Del Mar in 1936. William Quigley approached Bing Crosby with a proposal to build a horse racing track on site. Crosby agreed and was able to convince many friends and figures from Hollywood to join them on the project. The Del Mar Race Track opened the following year. A line from a song he recorded to play at the race track, "where the turf meets the surf" became a slogan of Del Mar.

With the influx of racing patrons, the neighboring airfield expanded and became Del Mar Municipal Airport in 1938. The facility was turned into a Naval Auxiliary Air Facility for blimps at Del Mar during World War II. Nearby grounds were also used to manufacture parts for Boeing B-17 Bombers. Anti-aircraft batteries were hidden in Eucalyptus groves with fortified positions built into the hillside. The Stratford Inn, renamed the Hotel Del Mar in the 1920s, was used to house military personnel. A pier from 1908, which was later demolished, was used to train thousands of United States Army recruits. United States Marine Corps from Camp Pendleton trained on the beaches. After the war, the Navy facility was decommissioned. The Naval property was transferred to Del Mar for a symbolic $1.00. It was later decided to build a new section of the Interstate 5 Highway through land used by the Del Mar Municipal airport. It shutdown in 1959 and was replaced by the Carlsbad McClellan–Palomar Airport.

The city incorporated in 1959. A significant motivation for the incorporation was to prevent high rises being built along the coast as had happened in La Jolla when it became part of the City of San Diego. Incorporation meant the city could manage itself, preserve its small town character, and protect the views of existing homeowners. The residents of higher areas of what was then referred to as Del Mar did not have the same degree of interest in being separate from the City of San Diego as their views were not at risk, and there was not the same concern that high rises would be built away from the coast. Opponents of incorporation were concerned over the costs of providing separate city service, which would thereby create an excessive tax burden. A re-vote on incorporation was forced in 1961, but it passed by an even larger margin than the initial vote.

Since only a portion of what was then Del Mar incorporated, it did not include all of the areas that were served by the Del Mar post office. Del Mar postal addresses do not match the incorporated city boundaries and can refer to two separate cities. Del Mar is one of only a few such areas in California. San Diego called the area of Del Mar it incorporated Del Mar Heights, but the old addresses never changed from Del Mar.

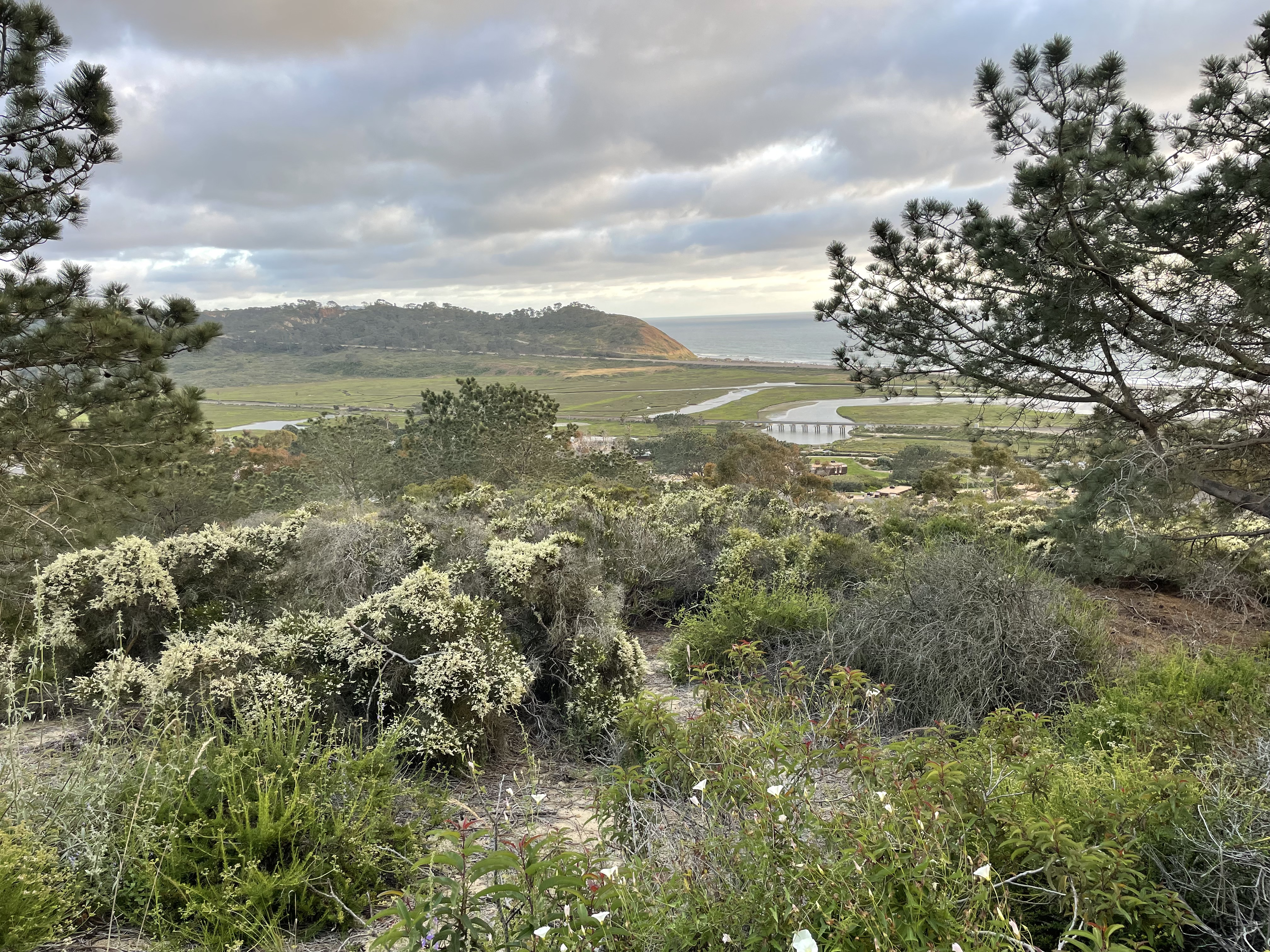
View of the Torrey Pines State Natural Reserve from the Extension

The San Diego Freeway opened in 1963 and the entire Interstate 5 was completed in 1966. This allowed vehicle traffic between Los Angeles and San Diego to bypass Del Mar. Along with the prior closure of the Del Mar Airport, this led to temporary difficulties for the city business district. The Hotel Del Mar closed in 1963. The following years were sometimes known at the Open Spaces Decade. From 1964, there was a campaign to expand the Torrey Pines State Park, later the Torrey Pines State Natural Reserve, into land that then included part of Del Mar. This became the Torrey Pines Natural Reserve Extension in 1970. The Torrey Pine became a specially protected tree in Del Mar and an unofficial symbol of the area. The Torrey pine branch with its needle-like leaves are used as part of the city logo. The tree has also been used by the city in public art. The movement to preserve open spaces and prevent excessive development also led to the establishment of Sea Grove Park.

Much of the population is on the coast and nearby bluff which are vulnerable to sea level rise caused by climate change. In 2019, the city refused to develop a managed retreat strategy for moving infrastructure and population centers from the water. This decision was made against the recommendation of the California Coastal Commission. Instead the city is planning on using other climate change adaptation strategies, such as seawalls and beach nourishment.

The Surf Line railroad tracks are adjacent to coastal bluffs some 40 feet (12 m) above the beach for 1.7 miles (2.7 km). Coastal erosion eats away at the bluffs each year. The North County Transit District drove steel beams into the beach at the base of the bluffs in September 2020 to stabilize the face of the bluffs for 20 or 30 years. The city wanted to require the transit agency to cover the shotcrete wall on the bluff with natural soil and native plantings. The city council, the California Coastal Commission, and residents have opposed the district's plans to install a chain-link fence that would stop pedestrians from crossing the tracks to get to the beach. The district considered this to be a safety issue as trespassers along the right-of-way have been hit by trains. This mile-and-a-half stretch (2.4 km) along the southern half of the city does not have legal access to the beach. Due to offshore reefs and wave patterns, this section has some of the best surfing in San Diego County.

== Geography ==
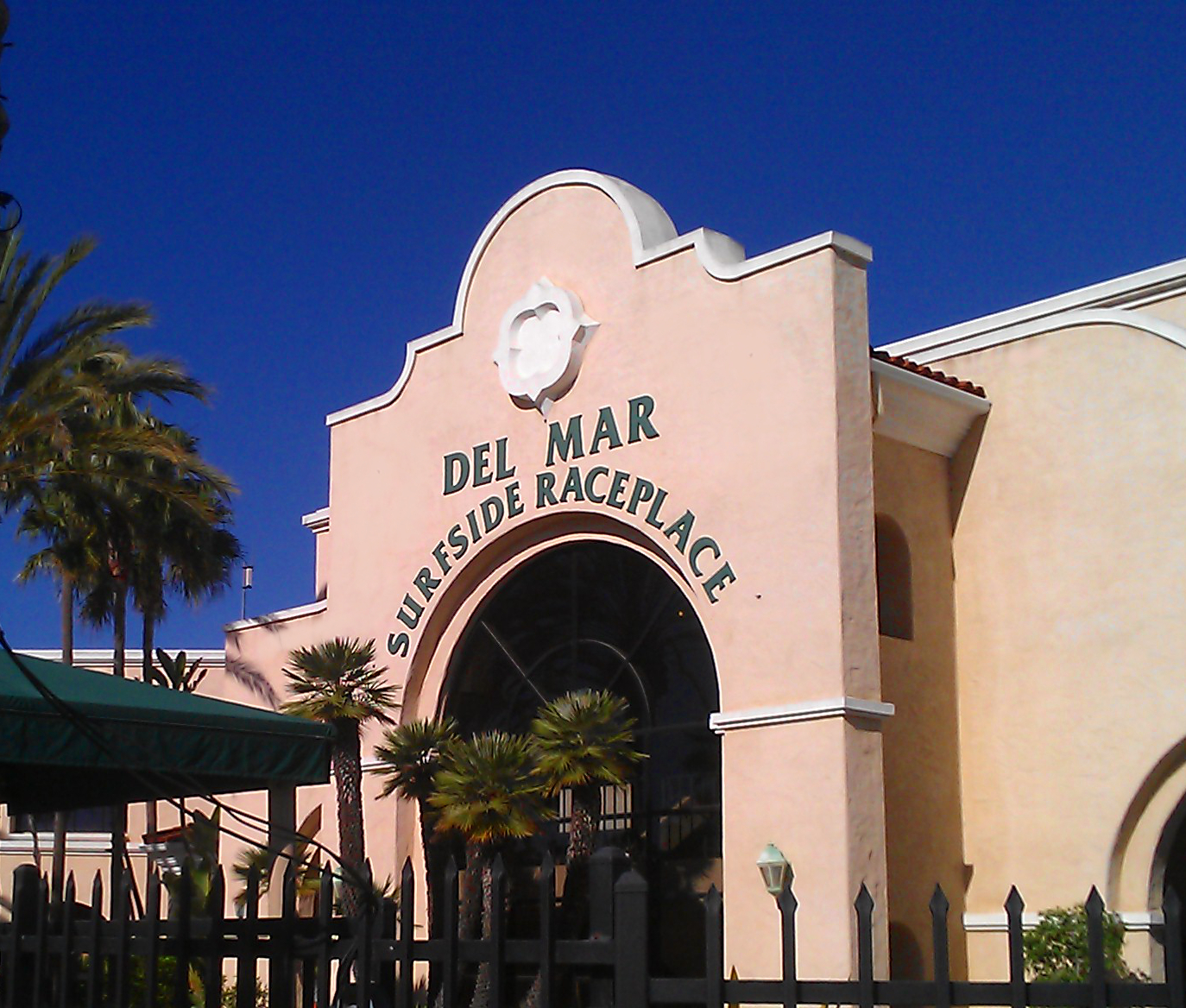
Surfside Raceplace

Del Mar is one of only two locations where the Torrey pine tree naturally occurs. The Torrey pine is the rarest pine in the United States; only two populations of this endangered species exist, in Del Mar and on Santa Rosa Island. The Soledad Valley at the south of Del Mar severs two colony segments.

At the southern edge of Del Mar is the Los Peñasquitos Lagoon. To the north is the San Dieguito Lagoon and the San Dieguito River, which empties into the Pacific Ocean at Del Mar.

The bluffs along Del Mar's south beach are subject to collapse. Properties on the bluffs are subject to the impacts of climate change, such as sea level rise and coastal erosion. The transportation infrastructure is under threat. The city has a climate change adaptation plan which excludes the option of a managed retreat, the strategy that was recommended by the California Coastal Commission in 2019.

According to the United States Census Bureau, the city has a total area of 1.8 square miles (4.7 km^{2}), of which 1.7 square miles (4.4 km^{2}) of it is land and 0.05 square miles (0.13 km^{2}) of it (3.08%) is water.

=== Climate ===
Del Mar's climate is considered mediterranean-subtropical with warm, dry summers and mild, humid winters. Temperatures exceed 85 °F (29 °C) only on a few occasions throughout the year and rarely drop below 41 °F (5 °C). The average yearly temperature in Del Mar is approximately 65 °F (18 °C). Del Mar regularly receives heavy marine layer clouds due to its position between two lagoons and bordered to the west by the Pacific Ocean.

== Demographics ==
Historical population
Census	Pop.	Note	%±
1960	3,124		—
1970	3,956		26.6%
1980	5,017		26.8%
1990	4,860		−3.1%
2000	4,389		−9.7%
2010	4,161		−5.2%
2020	3,954		−5.0%
U.S. Decennial Census; 1860–1870 1880-1890; 1900 1910 1920; 1930 1940 1950; 1960 1970 1980; 1990 2000 2010; 2020

=== Racial and ethnic composition ===
Del Mar city, California – Racial and ethnic composition Note: the US Census treats Hispanic/Latino as an ethnic category. This table excludes Latinos from the racial categories and assigns them to a separate category. Hispanics/Latinos may be of any race.
Race / Ethnicity (NH = Non-Hispanic)	Pop 2000	Pop 2010	Pop 2020	% 2000	% 2010	% 2020
White alone (NH)	3,990	3,772	3,282	90.91%	90.65%	83.00%
Black or African American alone (NH)	11	9	16	0.25%	0.22%	0.40%
Native American or Alaska Native alone (NH)	15	2	2	0.34%	0.05%	0.05%
Asian alone (NH)	126	115	145	2.87%	2.76%	3.67%
Native Hawaiian or Pacific Islander alone (NH)	2	1	4	0.05%	0.02%	0.10%
Other race alone (NH)	11	11	26	0.25%	0.26%	0.66%
Mixed race or Multiracial (NH)	64	76	205	1.46%	1.83%	5.18%
Hispanic or Latino (any race)	170	175	274	3.87%	4.21%	6.93%
Total	4,389	4,161	3,954	100.00%	100.00%	100.00%

=== 2020 census ===
As of the 2020 census, Del Mar had a population of 3,954 and a population density of 2,302.9 inhabitants per square mile (889.2/km^{2}).

The age distribution was 12.7% under the age of 18, 5.6% aged 18 to 24, 20.1% aged 25 to 44, 31.3% aged 45 to 64, and 30.3% who were 65 years of age or older. The median age was 53.9 years. For every 100 females, there were 97.7 males, and for every 100 females age 18 and over, there were 96.9 males age 18 and over.

100.0% of residents lived in urban areas, while 0.0% lived in rural areas.

The whole population lived in households. There were 1,932 households, out of which 18.6% included children under the age of 18. Of all households, 46.7% were married-couple households, 20.9% were households with a male householder and no spouse or partner present, and 25.7% were households with a female householder and no spouse or partner present. 32.9% of households were one person, and 14.0% were one person aged 65 or older. The average household size was 2.05. There were 1,101 families (57.0% of all households).

There were 2,574 housing units, of which 24.9% were vacant. The homeowner vacancy rate was 1.5% and the rental vacancy rate was 14.7%. Of the 1,932 occupied housing units, 57.4% were owner-occupied and 42.6% were occupied by renters.

=== Income and poverty ===
The median household income of Del Mar in 2019-2023 was $192,845, in 2023 dollars. About 0.4% of families and 2.5% of the population were below the poverty line.

=== 2010 census ===
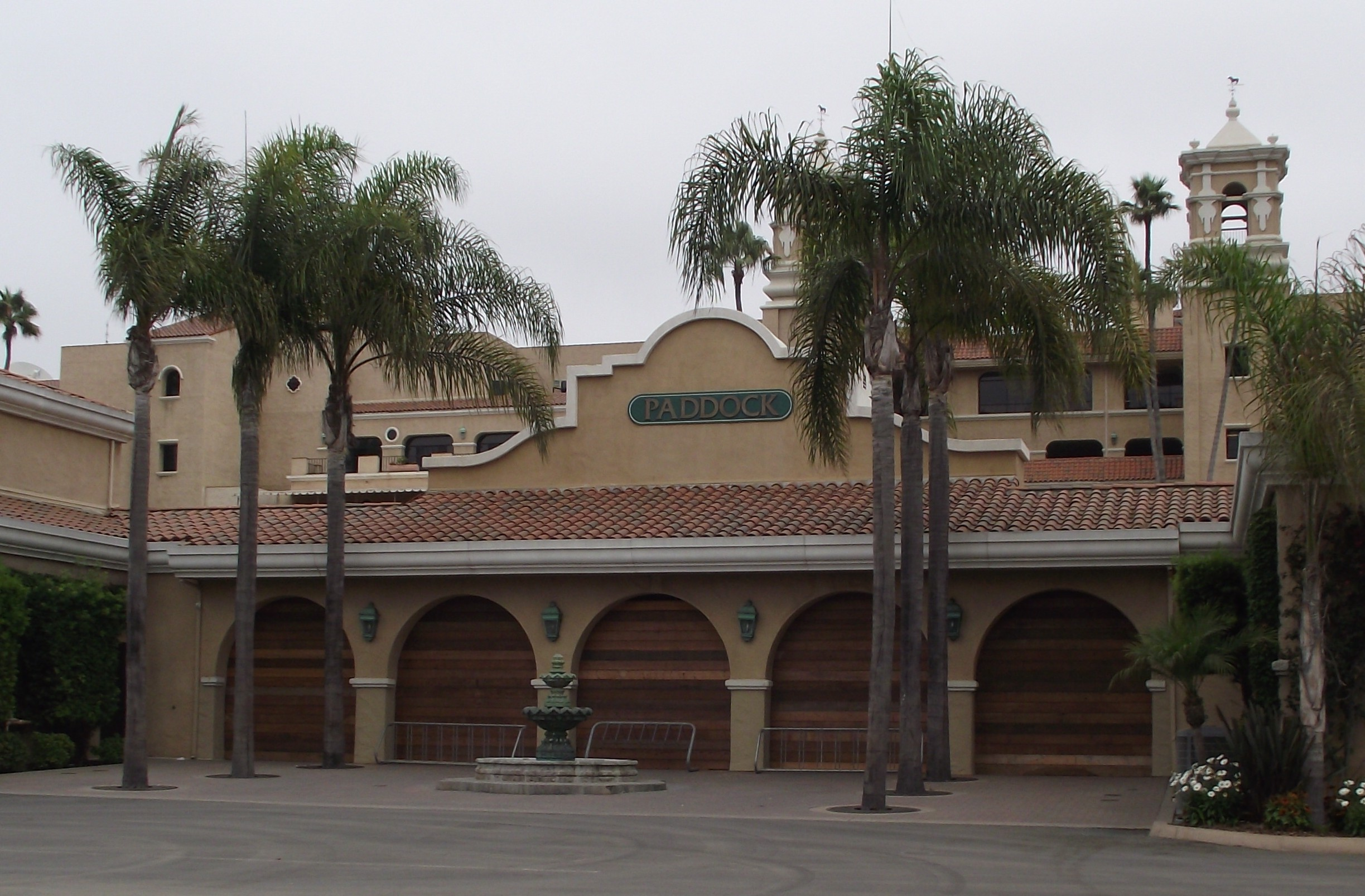
The Paddock at Del Mar Racetrack.

The 2010 United States census reported that Del Mar had a population of 4,161. The population density was 2,341.9 people per square mile (904.2 people/km^{2}). The racial makeup of Del Mar was 3,912 (94.0%) White, 10 (0.2%) African American, eight (0.2%) Native American, 118 (2.8%) Asian, three (0.1%) Pacific Islander, 25 (0.6%) from other races, and 85 (2.0%) from two or more races. Hispanic or Latino of any race were 175 people (4.2%).

There were 2,064 households, with 340 (16.5%) having children under the age of 18, and 927 (44.9%) with opposite-sex married couples living together, 114 (5.5%) had a female householder with no husband present, 57 (2.8%) had a male householder with no wife present. There were 124 (6.0%) unmarried opposite-sex partnerships, and 19 (0.9%) same-sex married couples or partnerships. There were 707 households (34.3%) comprising one individual, and 209 (10.1%) comprising one individual 65 years of age or older. The average household size was 2.02. There were 1,098 families (53.2% of all households); the average family size was 2.57.

The population comprised 564 people (13.6%) under the age of 18, 205 people (4.9%) aged 18 to 24, 1,071 people (25.7%) aged 25 to 44, 1,455 people (35.0%) aged 45 to 64, and 866 people (20.8%) who were 65 years of age or older. The median age was 48.6 years. For every 100 females, there were 102.1 males. For every 100 females age 18 and over, there were 101.1 males.

There were 2,596 housing units at an average density of 1,461.1 units per square mile (564.1 units/km^{2}), of which 1,113 (53.9%) were owner-occupied, and 951 (46.1%) were occupied by renters. The homeowner vacancy rate was 2.6%; the rental vacancy rate was 7.9%. Of the population, 2,398 people (57.6% of the population) lived in owner-occupied housing units and 1,763 people (42.4%) lived in rental housing units.

== Government ==
The City of Del Mar is governed by a city council of five elected representatives. Each year a new mayor is chosen from among the councilmembers. Tracy Martinez is the mayor in 2026.

In the California State Legislature, Del Mar is in the 38th senatorial district, represented by Democrat Catherine Blakespear, and in the 77th Assembly district, represented by Democrat Tasha Boerner.

In the United States House of Representatives, Del Mar is in California's 49th congressional district, represented by Democrat Mike Levin.

== Education ==
Del Mar is served by the Del Mar Union School District, which includes eight K–8 schools. High school education is provided by the San Dieguito Union High School District.

== Transportation ==
The North County Transit District operates their BREEZE bus service. The historic Del Mar station once served passengers on the Atchison, Topeka and Santa Fe Railway Surf Line and the Amtrak San Diegan intercity service between the early 1900s until its closure in 1995, due to the opening of the new Solana Beach station two miles north. That station provides Coaster commuter rail and Amtrak's Pacific Surfliner service. This trainline is the second busiest passenger rail corridor in the United States.

The railroad tracks were built adjacent to coastal bluffs some 40 feet (12 m) above the beach. The San Diego Association of Governments (SANDAG) is conducting a $3 million study on relocating the rail line farther inland through the city. On August 16, 2020, the California Coastal Commission emphasized the need to move the railroad tracks inland due to the persistent coastal erosion which eats away at the bluff each year. The accelerating rate of sea level rise due to global warming adds urgency to the issue. A tunnel under Del Mar which would cost more than $3 billion is being considered.

== Attractions ==
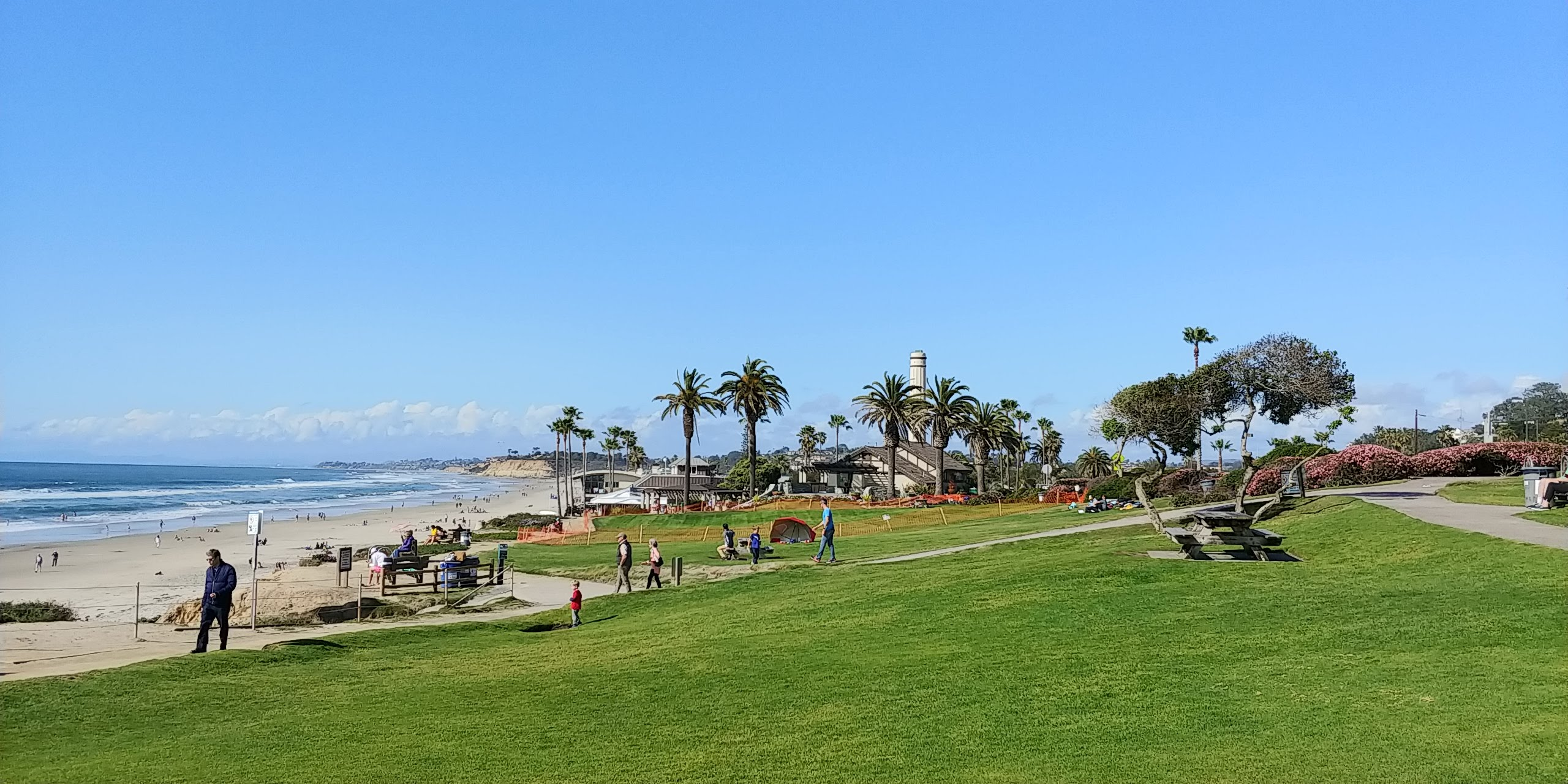
Powerhouse Park, Del Mar

- Del Mar Racetrack, held live during the summer and now the fall at the Del Mar Fairgrounds. The fairgrounds also hosts the satellite wagering facility Surfside Race Place throughout the year when races are not live.
- San Diego County Fair
- Torrey Pines State Beach
- Powerhouse Community Center
- Del Mar Antiques + Art + Design Show, held three times a year for over 50 years on the Del Mar Fairgrounds
- North Beach Area (29th Street to Solana Beach border), also known as "Dog Beach".

== Notable people ==
- Desi Arnaz, maintained a residence in North Del Mar on the beach west of Highway 101 near the Del Mar Racetrack after his divorce from Lucille Ball. He was arrested once for brandishing a firearm and ordering people off of his beach area. He resided there until his death.
- Brad Ausmus, Major League Baseball catcher, manager, and coach
- Burt Bacharach, songwriter, had a beach residence in north Del Mar.
- Gary Beck, radio DJ lived on top of Del Mar Heights in the early 70's on Mission Carmel Cove.
- Drew Brees, quarterback of the New Orleans Saints.
- Rachel Buehler, defender for the United States women's national soccer team.
- Martin Cooper, conceived the first handheld mobile phone.
- Tom DeLonge, guitarist and founding member of the pop-punk band Blink-182, rock band Angels & Airwaves, and punk rock band Box Car Racer.
- Jimmy Durante, lived on the beach for many years and has a street named after him.
- Steve Fisher, former head basketball coach at San Diego State University, resident since 1999.
- Rachael Flatt, former figure skater, 2010 Olympian, 2010 US Champion, three-time US silver medalist and 2008 World Junior Champion, was born in Del Mar.
- Bill Gates, co-founder of Microsoft Corporation, has a vacation residence on Del Mar beach.
- Joshua Groban, associate justice of the California Supreme Court
- Tony Hawk, skateboarder and business entrepreneur, was raised in Del Mar.
- Kristin Hayter, singer-songwriter
- Gary E. Jacobs, businessman, philanthropist, minority owner in the Sacramento Kings, founder of the Gary and Jerri-Ann Jacobs High Tech High Charter School, and owner of the Lake Elsinore Storm, lives in Del Mar.
- Sara Jacobs, US Congresswoman
- Nate Kaeding, former San Diego Chargers placekicker.
- Kamla K. Kapur, writer, poet, playwright
- Charles David Keeling, scientist known for the Keeling Curve, and Chairman of the Citizen Task Force responsible for developing the City of Del Mar's Community Plan (General Plan) adopted in 1976.
- George R. Lunn, former US Congressman and Lt. Governor of New York.
- William Murray, fiction editor and staff writer at The New Yorker for more than 30 years and author of numerous fiction and nonfiction work, including a series of mystery novels with a racetrack setting, spent the majority of his later years living in Del Mar.
- George Emil Palade, Romanian-American Nobel Prize winner.
- Carson Palmer, former NFL quarterback.
- Ardem Patapoutian, molecular biologist and neuroscientist, awarded Nobel Prize in Medicine in 2021; lives in Del Mar.
- Steve Perry, former lead singer of the rock band Journey, lives in Del Mar.
- Tristan Prettyman, singer-songwriter.
- Roger Reynolds, Pulitzer Prize-winning composer residing in Del Mar; also honored with Fulbright, Guggenheim, National Endowment for the Arts, and National Institute of Arts and Letters awards.
- Zandra Rhodes, English celebrity fashion designer, splits her time between homes in Del Mar and London.
- Aaron Rodgers, quarterback for the Green Bay Packers previously had a residence in Del Mar, selling it in 2022.
- Willie Shoemaker, jockey, lived in North Del Mar on beach west of US 101 near Del Mar Racetrack.
- Payson R. Stevens, science communicator, artist, writer, filmmaker, environmentalist
- CJ Stubbs, Major League Baseball catcher for the Washington Nationals.
- Garrett Stubbs, Major League Baseball catcher for the Philadelphia Phillies.
- Bertram Turetzky, double bass player, composer, and author of The Contemporary Contrabass (1974); UCSD Distinguished Emeritus Professor of Music.
- Norv Turner, former head coach of the San Diego Chargers.
- Jacqueline Mamerickx Winterer, geomorphologist, Scripps Institution of Oceanography; work focused on depth anomalies, morphology of sea structures and topography, bathymetry, and evolution of the ocean; constructed bathymetric charts covering the Pacific; served as Mayor of Del Mar (1991-92).

== In popular culture ==
- Tip on a Dead Crab (Viking Press 1984), William Murray's first mystery in the Shifty Lou Anderson series, is set at Del Mar's racetrack.
- You Can See Everything, a documentary directed by Nathan Fielder and Lance Oppenheim, was largely filmed at rented home Del Mar where Theranos founder Elizabeth Holmes lived in the week before reporting to federal prison in 2023.
