= Del Mar Antiques + Art + Design Show =

Antique show in Del Mar, California, U.S.

- Status: Active
- Genre: Antiques
- Venue: Del Mar Fairgrounds
- Location: Del Mar, California
- Country: United States
- Inaugurated: 1961
- Attendance: 7,000
- Organizer: Michael Grimes
- Website: Del Mar Antiques + Art + Design Show

The Del Mar Antiques + Art + Design Show is an antique show held at the Del Mar Fairgrounds in Del Mar, California. It is the longest-running family owned indoor antique show in California.

== History ==
The show was established in 1961 by Joseph and Bettye Grimes, who at one time had shows throughout the Southern California region, known as the Calendar Shows. The Grimes advertised the show as having everything "from tin to Tiffany". It is currently owned and operated by the Grimes' son, Michael.

== Show highlights ==
Typically visiting the show, where up to 7,000 people attend, are costumed members of the San Diego Costume Guild and Red Hat Society members. Each year is themed. For example, the theme for a 2010 show was "Masquerade: A Venice Carnivale at Del Mar." In 2007, organizer and producer Michael Grimes produced a similar themed show, named the Wild West Expo, which Today's Vintage newspaper described as the "Old West starring alongside traditional antiques."

The show is the largest indoor antiques show south of San Francisco and attracts over 100 antiques dealers from across the western United States. During the downturn in the economy, the 2009 show had 20 percent fewer exhibitors than usual. But participation over the next two years increased again, surpassing the 2009 number.

In 2010, Grimes organized The Green Meets Green Expo, also held at the Del Mar Fairgrounds. The San Diego Union-Tribune wrote that the expo was "where old and new converge with an eco-friendly theme."

== See also ==
- Antique Trader
