= Kamla K. Kapur =

Indian-American playwright and poet

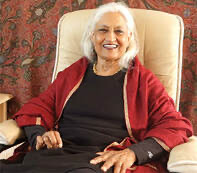
- Born: 27 July 1948 (age 77)
- Education: Kent State University; Ohio State University
- Occupations: Writer, poet, playwright
- Employer(s): Grossmont College; Delhi University
- Spouse: Payson R. Stevens
- Awards: Sultan Padamsee Award for Playwrighting in English (2)
- Website: https://www.kamlakkapur.com/

Kamla K. Kapur (born 27 July 1948) is an Indian-American playwright, poet, and author. She is noted for her creative-retellings of stories, legends, and myths around Hindu gods, the Sikh Gurus, and the Sufi mystic Rumi, as well as several critically-acclaimed plays in English which have been produced in the US and India.

== Personal life and education ==
Kapur was born and raised in India. She has roots in Chandigarh. She was raised as a Sikh and identifies as one. Nonetheless, in her writings she often creatively retells stories from both Sikhism and other faiths, especially Hindu mythologies and the writings of the Sufi mystic Rumi.

She obtained an MA in Literature from Kent State University (1972), and studied creative writing at the University of Iowa.

Over 1974-78, she lived in India. In this period, she taught literature at Delhi University, freelanced for The Times of India, The Hindustan Times, and The Tribune, and wrote and published poetry, short stories, and award-winning plays.

Kapur was earlier married to Donald Dean Powell, a Vietnam veteran who committed suicide in 1993. In an interview with Friedmann Schaub, she attributed Powell's suicide as a fundamentally transformative event that made her more self-aware, sensitive, compassionate, and interested in mystical perspectives on suffering, such as those of the Sufis.

She is married to Payson R. Stevens. They divide their time between the Kullu valley in the Indian Himalayas and Del Mar, San Diego, California.

== Works ==
Kapur taught literature at Grossmont College (San Diego, California) for 18 years.

Kapur's writing has been featured in anthologies and journals such as Parabola and The Sun.

She has been interviewed about her writings on several radio talks and podcasts in the United States.

=== Books ===
As a Fountain in a Garden (2005) is Kapur's elegiac tribute to her former husband Donald Dean Powell, expressed over 31 poems.

Ganesha Goes to Lunch (2007), is Kapur's creative retelling of stories around various Hindu gods from a variety of mythological resources - including the Ramayana, the Mahabharata, and the Puranas.

The Singing Guru was released in Chandigarh on 26 July 2015 by the art critic B.N. Goswamy and the theatre artist Neelam Mansingh Chowdhury. In this book, Kapur creates a narrative around the life and travels of Guru Nanak Dev, the first Sikh guru, by interweaving stories from the Janam Sakhis with her own imagination and humour. Into the Great Heart (2018) tells stories from the life and adventures of Guru Angad Dev, the second Sikh guru.

Kapur has written two books that creatively retell stories from the life of the 13th-century Sufi teacher, mystic, and poet Rumi. The first, Rumi's Tales from the Silk Road: a Pilgrimage to Paradise, was released in India in late 2009 at The American Centre, New Delhi, by the film director Muzaffar Ali. The second, Rumi: Tales to Live By, was released in Chandigarh on 21 October 2017 by the poet Sumita Misra, the journalist Roopinder Singh, and the theatre director Neelam Mansingh Chowdhury. Nonika Singh from the Tribune notes that each story contained in this book is followed by a long commentary which endeavours to clearly bring forth the import of these ancient stories for modern 'time-crunched' audiences. This book was released in the US in March 2019, under the title Rumi: Tales of the Spirit, a Journey of Healing the Heart.

In Shared Sacred Landscapes: Stories from Mt Kailas, Tise & Kang Rinpoche (Nepal: Vajra Publications, 2017), Kapur creatively retells some of the folk stories from the regions of India, Tibet, and Nepal proximate to Tibet's Mt. Kailas contained in this short-story collection. The Nepali writer Prawin Adhikari retold the other stories in this collection.

In The Privilege of Aging: Savouring the Fullness of Life (2024), Kapur shares personal stories, reflections, and life lessons around the process of ageing.

=== Theatre productions of Kapur's plays ===
==== In the United States ====
Kapur's plays Hamlet’s Father was showcased at the Marin Shakespeare Festival (San Francisco), Kepler Dreams at the Gas Lamp Quarter Theatre (San Diego), and Clytemnestra at the Dramatic Risks Theatre Group (New York).

==== In India ====
Her play The Curlew’s Cry was produced by the Delhi-based theatre group Yatrik. The Company, a Chandigarh-based theatre group, produced a Punjabi version of her play Clytemnestra.

== Recognition ==
- Kapur was twice awarded the 'Sultan Padamsse Award for Playwriting in English' in India, for her plays Camia in 1977 and Zenana in 1978 respectively.
- She featured in the US-wide compilation Who's Who Among Asian Americans, 1994-95.

== Bibliography ==
- Radha Sings (Dark Child Press, 1987), republished in India and the US as Radha Sings: Erotic Love Poems (Tarang Press, 2019)
- As a Fountain in a Garden, republished as The Gift of Grief (Tarang Press, 2005)
- Ganesha Goes to Lunch: Classics from Mystic India (USA: Mandala, 2007), retitled and published as Classic Tales from Mystic India in India (Jaico Publishing, 2013).
- Rumi’s Tales from the Silk Road: a Pilgrimage to Paradise (Mandala USA and Penguin India, 2009).
- The Singing Guru: Legends and Adventures of Guru Nanak, the First Sikh (Jaico, 2015).
- Into the Great Heart: Legends and Adventures of the Guru Angad, the Second Sikh Guru (Jaico, 2018).
- Rumi: Tales to Live By (India: Jaico, 2017), retitled and published as Rumi: Tales of the Spirit in the US (Mandala, 2019).
- The Privilege of Aging: Savouring the Fullness of Life (Park Street Press, 2024).
