= Biology Today =

Cover of the first edition

Biology Today is a college-level biology textbook that went through three editions in 1972, 1975, and 1980. The first edition, published by Communications Research Machines, Inc. (CRM) and written by a small editorial team and large set of prominent "contributing consultants", is notable for its lavish illustrations and its humanistic approach. The second and third editions (published in 1975 and 1980 by CRM/Random and Random House alone, respectively) were significantly rewritten by Washington University in St. Louis biologist David L. Kirk and others.

== First edition ==
Noah's Ark, by Kerstin Apelman Öberg, was used in the chapter on "Human Sexual Behavior"; this and other objectionable images led to limited adoption of the first edition and were removed in later editions.

The 1972 first edition of Biology Today had no principal author but was written by fifty-four contributing consultants, many of whom were leading figures in biology (and seven of whom were Nobel laureates). Visually, it features numerous artistic interpretations of biological topics as well as striking diagrams and photographs. Many of these images, such as a surreal depiction of the injection of heroin, a series of diagrams showing how to use a contraceptive diaphragm, and a painting titled Noah's Ark depicting copulating humans and animals, proved controversial and led to few adoptions of the textbook. By 1981, a reviewer of a later, much-changed edition wrote that the original "might now be considered a 'classic' for it is hardly likely that such a fine humanistic biology textbook will be published again. (If you have a copy, hold on to it.)"

In the preface, John H. Painter, Jr.—leader of the editorial team and credited as the book's publisher—explains that "science is a peculiarly human endeavor that seeks to newer and better solutions to the problems plaguing us all"; that modern biological sciences are rooted in work of physicists who turned to biology after World War II; that understanding life at the molecular level allows science to find "solutions to problems of immediate concern", rather than earlier biological studies that "floated disconnectedly above the physical and chemical substrate of life"; and that information processing is at the core of many biological advances.

The introduction is an illustrated essay, "What Is Life?", by Albert Szent-Györgyi—a Nobel Prize-winning biochemist and, as the essay's biographical tag explains, a protester against "the irrational pursuit of war and politics that characterizes our Western culture" as well as an advocate of using technology "to create a psychologically and socially progressive world where humanistic values are paramount". The essay explains Szent-Györgyi's outlook on the fundamental problems of biology, the relationship between biological and physical sciences, and reasons for pursuing biology. Szent-Györgyi concludes that "To express the marvels of nature in the language of science is one of man's noblest endeavors. I no reason to expect the completion of that task within the near future."

=== Biology Today Film Series ===
CRM produced a series of films associated with Biology Today: The Origin of Life and Evolution, The Cell: A Functioning Structure (in two parts), and Muscle. Like the textbook, the films were visually innovative, featuring extensive animation to depict complex aspects of biology.

According to a review in The American Biology Teacher, The Origin of Life and Evolution used "creative cinematography to recreate current views" and won awards at "two major education film festivals". While the reviewer considered it the best of its kind (in 1977) and praised it both for educational value and captivating "visual imagery", he noted that it was too sophisticated for the full range of its intended audiences and that "basic knowledge of DNA is a prerequisite for gaining maximum usefulness from the film."

=== Contributing consultants ===
- Preston Adams
- Thomas Peter Bennett
- Konrad E. Bloch
- John Tyler Bonner
- Frank Macfarlane Burnet
- Michael Crichton
- Elizabeth G. Cutter
- Max Delbrück
- Joyce A. F. Diener
- John E. Dowling
- John C. Eccles
- Leland N. Edmunds, Jr.
- J. S. Finlayson
- William Fishbein
- Paul Gebhard
- Terrell H. Hamilton
- Peter H. Hartline
- J. Woodland Hastings
- Jonathan Hodge
- John Holland
- Yashuo Hotta
- Tom D. Humphreys II
- Daniel H. Janzen
- William A. Jensen
- Robert W. Kistner
- Hans Adolf Krebs
- Lee H. Kronenberg
- Richard C. Lewontin
- Robert D. Lisk
- William F. Loomis, Jr.
- Vincent T. Marchesi
- Peter Marler
- Donald M. Maynard
- James L. McGaugh
- Stanley L. Miller
- James V. Neel
- David M. Phillips
- David M. Prescott
- Eugene Rabinowitch
- Roberts Rugh
- Howard A. Schneiderman
- Michael Soulé
- Paul S. G. Stein
- Payson R. Stevens
- Albert Szent-Györgyi
- J. Herbert Taylor
- Kenneth V. Thimann
- Jared Tinklenberg
- Gordon M. Tomkins
- Harold C. Urey
- James D. Watson
- J. S. Weiner
- Robert H. Whittaker

== Second and third editions ==
The second and third editions (published in 1975 and 1980 by CRM/Random and Random House alone, respectively) were significantly rewritten by Washington University biologist David L. Kirk and others. Kirk wrote fifteen chapters of the second edition and co-wrote five more. With the second edition, the controversial material from the original was removed, and the list of contributing consultants was smaller.

The third edition was very different from the first. It had, for the first time, a principal author credited (David L. Kirk) and had a long list of consultants (not "contributing consultants" as in the earlier editions). The third edition had 31 chapters grouped into six sections (there were 45 chapters in 8 sections in the original), and rather than a humanistic approach for a broad college audience, it employed what Kirk described as "a somewhat more rigorous approach than many competing textbooks". A reviewer judged it "well-written, pedogogically sound, and, generally, scientifically accurate", but lacking the stylistic flair (and the seven Nobel Prize-winning contributors) of the original.
