= John Tyler Bonner =

American biologist (1920–2019)

- Born: May 12, 1920; New York City, U.S.
- Died: February 7, 2019 (aged 98); Portland, Oregon, U.S.
- Education: Harvard University
- Scientific career
- Fields: Developmental biology
- Workplaces: Princeton University

John Tyler Bonner (May 12, 1920 – February 7, 2019) was an American biologist.

== Life ==
John Tyler Bonner was a professor in the Department of Ecology and Evolutionary Biology at Princeton University. He was a pioneer in the use of cellular slime molds to understand evolution and development over a career of 40 years and was one of the world's leading experts on cellular slime moulds. Arizona State University says that the establishment and growth of developmental-evolutionary biology owes a great debt to the work of Bonner's studies. His work is highly readable and unusually clearly written and his contributions have made many complicated ideas of biology accessible to a wide audience.

== Career ==
Bonner was the George M. Moffett Professor Emeritus of Biology at Princeton University. He was trained at Harvard University between 1937 and 1947, aside from a stint in the United States Army Air Forces from 1942 to 1946. He soon joined the faculty of Princeton University, becoming the chairman of the Princeton Biology Department between 1966 and 1977, also in 1983-84 and 1987–88.

He held four honorary doctorates and was a fellow of the American Association for the Advancement of Science. He was elected to the American Academy of Arts and Sciences in 1969 and the American Philosophical Society in 1972. He was made a National Academy of Sciences fellow in 1973.

He was a visiting scholar at the Indian Institute of Science in 1993 and the Indian Academy of Sciences in 1990. He has also been visiting faculty at Brooklyn College, Williams College and University College, London. He also was a Sheldon Travelling Fellow in 1941 in Panama and Cuba while in graduate school, a Rockefeller Traveling Fellow 1953 in Paris, France, and held Guggenheim Fellowships in 1958 and from 1971 to 1972 in Edinburgh, Scotland. He held a National Science Foundation Senior Postdoctoral Fellowship in Cambridge, England in 1963. He also had Commonwealth Foundation Book Fund Fellowships in 1971 and between 1984 and in 1985 Edinburgh, Scotland and a Josiah Macy, Jr. Foundation Book Fund Fellowship in 1978 in Edinburgh, Scotland. He died in February 2019 at the age of 98.

== Works ==
He wrote several books on developmental biology and evolution, many scientific papers, and produced a number of works in biology. He is best known as one of the world's leading experts on slime moulds and he led the way in making Dictyostelium discoideum a model organism central to examining some of the major questions in experimental biology. He defined the complexity of an organism as the number of types of cells in it though complexity theorists disagree, and he argued that both plant and animal taxa which have evolved later, have a greater number of cell types than their predecessors, and sought an explanation acceptable to neo-Darwinism.

His works include:

- The Cellular Slime Molds
- The Evolution of Complexity by Means of Natural Selection.
- The Evolution of Culture in Animals
- Life Cycles
- Morphogenesis: an Essay on Development
- On Development: The Biology of Form, Harvard University Press
- Cells and Societies
- First Signals
- The Ideas of Biology
- Sixty Years of Biology
- Size and Cycle
- Why Size Matters: From Bacteria to Blue Whales
- Lives of a Biologist: Adventures in a Century of Extraordinary Science, Harvard University Press.
- Randomness in Evolution. Princeton University Press, Princeton, NJ 2013, ISBN 978-1-400846429.

His autobiography, Lives of a Biologist: Adventures in a Century of Extraordinary Science was the winner of the 2002 ForeWord Magazine Book of the Year Award.

== Support for evolution ==
Bonner was involved with one of the earliest American efforts to express scientific support for evolution. The Nobel Prize–winning American biologist Hermann J. Muller circulated a petition in May 1966 entitled: "Is Biological Evolution a Principle of Nature that has been well established by Science?". Bonner signed this manifesto, along with 176 other leading American biologists, including several Nobel Prize winners.

== See also ==
- Biology Today, college-level biology textbook, contribution by Bonner
