= Carmine Pariante =

Researcher

Carmine Maria Pariante FRCPsych (born March 1966) is professor of biological psychiatry at the Institute of Psychiatry at King's College, London, and consultant perinatal psychiatrist at the South London and Maudsley NHS Trust. He also works as the lead for the Affective Disorders and Interface with Medicine theme at the National Institute for Health and Care Research (NIHR) Maudsley Biomedical Research Centre (BRC).

He received his PhD from the University of London and his MD from Gemelli University, Rome.

Pariante's work specialises in the role of stress in the pathogenesis of mental disorders and in the response to psychotropic drugs. He focuses on depression and fatigue, particularly with respect to the perinatal period and in those suffering from medical disorders.

In 2012, he was named Academic Psychiatrist of the Year by the Royal College of Psychiatrists.

Pariante is editor-in-chief for Brain, Behavior and Immunity and its open-access companion journal Brain, Behavior and Immunity Integrative.
