= Dolly Johnson Antique and Art Show =

Annual antique and art show in Fort Worth, Texas, U.S.

Coordinates: 32.745°N 97.367°W

The Dolly Johnson Antique and Art Show, also called The Dolly Show, founded in 1963 by Dolly Johnson in Fort Worth, Texas, was a large annual antiques show held for nearly 50 years at the Will Rogers Memorial Center in Fort Worth's Cultural District. Johnson got her start driving across the country in a car she called "Uncle Sam" and it claimed to be the oldest antique show in the South West.

In 2009, the show was bought by Jan Orr-Harter and renamed The Fort Show of Antiques and Art. In 2020 the show was acquired by Luxe Events and further rebranded as the Fort Worth Show of Antiques, Art & Jewelry.
