= Robert Ader =

American psychologist and academic

- Born: February 20, 1932; Bronx, New York, USA
- Died: December 20, 2011 (aged 79); Pittsford, NY, USA
- Scientific career
- Fields: Psychology, psychoneuroimmunology

Robert Ader (February 20, 1932 – December 20, 2011) was an American psychologist and academic who co-founded psychoneuroimmunology, a field of study which explores the links connecting the brain, behavior, and the immune system. Ader was a professor emeritus at the University of Rochester Medical Center.

== Early life ==
Robert Ader was born on February 20, 1932, in the Bronx, New York City. He was the older of two sons of Nathan and Mae Ader. After graduating from the Horace Mann School in New York City, he attended Tulane University in New Orleans. He graduated from Tulane University with a bachelor's degree in psychology in 1953. Ader then went on to earn a Ph.D. in psychology from Cornell University in 1957. After earning his Ph.D., he became a part-time instructor in the Department of Psychology at the University of Rochester and a part-time instructor in the Department of Psychiatry at the University of Rochester School of Medicine & Dentistry. He spent his time at the University of Rochester conducting psychobiological research on animals.

== Academic career ==
Robert Ader spent his entire career at the University of Rochester, where he held many teaching and research positions. He was appointed the director of the Division of Behavioral and Psychosocial Medicine in the University of Rochester’s department of psychology and director of the Center for Psychoneuroimmunology Research. He retired in July 2011 as professor emeritus of psychosocial medicine. During his career, he authored and helped coauthor over two hundred journal articles and chapters in books. He also founded the journal Brain, Behavior, and Immunity, which he served as editor-in-chief for many years. He also served on editorial boards for various psychobiological and behavioral journals. In addition, he served as president of the American Psychosomatic Society from 1979 to 1982, president of the International Society for Developmental Psychobiology from 1981 to 1982, president of the Academy of Behavioral Medicine Research from 1984 to 1985, and president and founder of the Psychoneuroimmunology Research Society. He also received an honorary M.D. degree from the University of Trondheim in Norway.

== Research in psychoneuroimmunology ==
On beginning his career as a part-time instructor in the Department of Psychiatry at the University of Rochester, Robert Ader focused his research on behavioral conditioning and emotional responsiveness in rats.

In 1974, Ader and a fellow researcher Nicholas Cohen were studying taste aversion in rats. The researchers gave the rats water sweetened with saccharin followed by an injection of cyclophosphamide, an immunosuppressant which caused nausea. Through classical conditioning, the rats learned to avoid water that contained saccharin. When Ader and Cohen began to force feed the rats the saccharin solution, they noticed that the rats began to die. They also found that the rate of death was directly related to how much saccharin solution the rats consumed. In a 2010 interview, Ader said “A hypothesis that seemed reasonable to me was that, in addition to conditioning the avoidance response, we were conditioning the immunosuppressive effects (of cyclophosphamide)." From these findings, they proposed a theory that the rats died because the taste of saccharin by itself was enough to elicit neural signals in the rats' brain that suppressed their immune systems (as if they had been overdosed with cyclophosphamide). Due to weakened immune systems, the rats contracted bacterial and viral infections that they were unable to fight off.

This finding led to the belief that there are connections between the brain and the immune system which contradicted with the previous belief that the immune system was autonomous. This serendipitous discovery led Robert Ader to continue research in and develop the field of psychoneuroimmunology, a term that he created and first used in his 1980 presidential speech to the American Psychosomatic Society. A year later, he also used the newly created term as the title for his collection of essays that described the beginning of a new field of research.

== Later life ==
Robert Ader spent 54 years at the University of Rochester until his retirement in 2011. Ader died at the Highlands at Pittsford, New York, on December 20, 2011, at the age of 79. His death was caused by a long illness and complications due to a fracture he obtained from a fall. He was married to his wife of 54 years, Gayle Ader and they had four daughters.

== Selected readings ==
=== Publications and articles ===
- 1980 Psychosomatic and Psychoimmunologic Research
- 1981 Animal Models in the Study of Brain, Behavior and Bodily Disease
- 1991 Conditioning of the Immune System
- 1995 Psychoneuroimmunology: Interactions between the Nervous System and the Immune System
- 2001 Psychoneuroimmunology
