= Brain, Behavior, and Immunity =

- Discipline: Neuroimmunology
- Language: English
- Edited by: Carmine Pariante

Publication details
- History: 1987–present
- Publisher: Elsevier
- Frequency: 8/year
- Impact factor: 7.1 (2024)

Standard abbreviations
- ISO 4: Brain Behav. Immun.

Indexing
- CODEN: BBIMEW
- ISSN: 0889-1591

Links
- Journal homepage

Brain, Behavior, and Immunity is a peer-reviewed scientific journal published by Elsevier. It was established in 1987 by Robert Ader, and covers research on the relationship between the nervous system, psychology, and the immune system. It is the official journal of the PsychoNeuroimmunology Research Society (PNIRS). According to the Journal Citation Reports, the journal has a 2023 impact factor of 8.8.
