= Pehr Henrik Ling =

Swedish massage therapist and teacher (1776–1839)

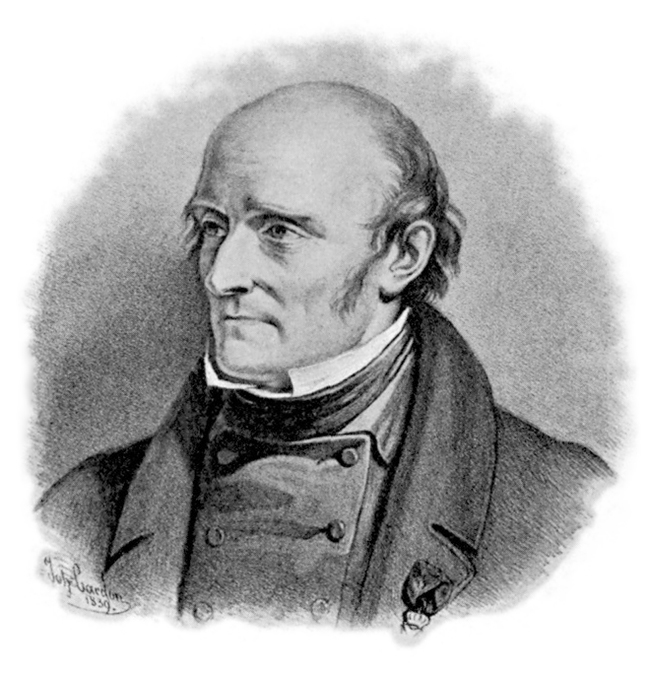
Pehr Henrik Ling

Pehr Henrik Ling (15 November 1776 – 3 May 1839) pioneered the teaching of physical education and gymnastics in Sweden. He is considered the Father of Physical Therapy in Sweden. Although his procedures included friction, kneading, stroking, cupping, and clapping they were not related to what was later termed as Swedish massage.

== Early life ==
Ling was born in Södra Ljunga, Småland in 1776. His parents were Lars Peter Ling, a minister, and Hedvig Maria (Hedda) Molin. On his maternal side, Ling was the great-great-grandson of the famous Swedish scientist Olof Rudbeck (1630–1702), who discovered the human lymphatic system. His family tree extends back to the sixteenth century and includes clergymen and peasants. His great-grandfather apparently lived to 105 and had seventeen sons and two daughters. After graduating from the Växjö gymnasium in 1792, he studied theology at Lund University from 1793, completing his degree at Uppsala University in 1799. He then worked as a tutor for several families for the next three years.

== Travels ==
In 1800, Ling left Sweden and lived abroad and traveled for seven years. He studied modern languages at the University of Copenhagen. He then traveled to Germany, France, and England. He took part in a naval battle as a volunteer on a Danish ship. Ling studied Goethe and Schiller, the Edda and northern mythology, and composed original poems in Swedish, German, French and Danish. He learned fencing at a school of French emigres and noticed its benefits, and those of physical education, on the gout in his arm. Financial difficulties and rheumatism caused him to return to Sweden.

== Teaching ==
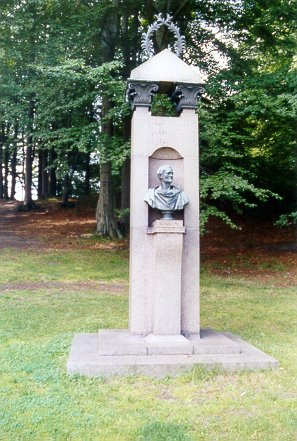
Bust of Pehr Henrik Ling in Gothenburg

Ling read Johann Christoph Friedrich GutsMuths' book Gymnastics for the Youth, and participated in the gymnastic exercises of the originator of Danish gymnastics, Franz Nachtegall He returned to Sweden 1804 in order to establish a gymnastic institute.

It is possible that Ling's gymnastics were inspired by Chinese body exercises. Also it is possible that Ling's method influenced the development of Chinese body exercises, that is from the West to China.

Back in Sweden, Ling began a routine of daily exercise, including fencing, and in 1805 was appointed as a master of fencing at Lund University. Having discovered that his daily exercises had restored his health, Ling decided to apply this experience for the benefit of others. He saw the potential of adapting these techniques to promote better health in many situations and thus attended classes in anatomy and physiology, and went through the entire curriculum for the training of a medical doctor. He then outlined a system of gymnastics, exercises, and maneuvers divided into four branches: pedagogical, medical, military, and aesthetic which carried out his theories and demonstrated the scientific rigor to be integrated or approved by established medical practitioners. Ling was the gymnastics instructor in the Military Academy at Carlsberg.

After several attempts to interest the Swedish government, Ling at last obtained government cooperation in 1813, and founded the Royal Central Gymnastics Institute for the training of gymnastic instructors was opened in Stockholm, with Ling appointed as principal. Ling invented physical education apparatus including the box horse, wall bars, and beams. He is also credited with developing calisthenics and free calisthenics. Orthodox medical practitioners were opposed to the claims made by Ling and his disciples. However, by 1831, Ling was elected a member of the Swedish General Medical Association (Svenska läkaresällskapet), which demonstrated that his methods were regarded as worthy of professional recognition. He was elected a member of the Swedish Academy in 1835 and became a titular professor the same year.

== Legacy ==
When Ling died of tuberculosis in 1839, he had charged three of his pupils with carrying on his legacy. These pupils were Lars Gabriel Branting (1799–1881), who succeeded Ling as principal of the institute; August Georgii, who became sub-director of the institute; and his own son, Hjalmar Ling (1820–1886). These three, along with Major Thure Brandt, who from c. 1861 specialized in the treatment of women (gynecological gymnastics), are regarded as the pioneers of Swedish medical gymnastics.

Although Ling is sometimes credited as the father of Swedish massage, it was not a part of his Gymnastic Movements nor the curriculum of the Royal Central Gymnastic Institute founded by Ling in 1813. The Swedish massage techniques effleurage (long, gliding strokes), petrissage (lifting and kneading the muscles), friction (firm, deep, circular rubbing movements), tapotement (brisk tapping or percussive movements), and vibration (rapidly shaking or vibrating specific muscles) are largely credited to Johann Georg Mezger (1838–1909).

Some sources mention that Ling learned massage from a Chinese friend, Ming, but this was an invention of Ling's rivals, in an effort to discredit his work. Although Ling was probably aware of Chinese massage, he instead developed a system of integrated manual therapy, combining physical training and gymnastic procedures with knowledge of anatomy, physiology, and pathology. He was the first to publish and popularize such a system with modern scientific knowledge.

Ling's system of medical gymnastics also influenced later institutions and systems. The Gymnastic Orthopedic Institute was founded in Stockholm in 1822 by Nils Åkerman, which from 1827 received a government grant. Around 1857, Gustav Zander developed a medico-mechanical system of gymnastics, known by his name, founding the Zander Institute at Stockholm in 1865. At the Stockholm Gymnastic Central Institute, qualified medical faculties have supervised the medical department since 1864. The Dedham Public Schools began teaching the Ling System in 1893.

Other accounts of Dr Ling's practice and philosophies were published: a Handbook of Medical Gymnastics (English edition, 1899) by Anders Wide of Stockholm represents the more conservative practice. Henrik Kellgren's system is partially based on Ling's, and is described in The Elements of Kellgren's Manual Treatment (1903) by Edgar F. Cyriax, who, before earning his MD at Edinburgh, had served at the Stockholm Institute as a gymnastic director. See also the encyclopedic work Sweden: its people and its industry: historical and statistical handbook (1904), p. 348, edited by Gustav Sandburg for the Swedish government.

The yoga scholars Mark Singleton and Anya Foxen state that Ling's gymnastics shaped the development of modern yoga as exercise in the Western world.

In 1939 and again in 1949, Sweden held a large gymnastics competition named for Ling, "The Lingiad" (written Lingiaden in Swedish).

== Honors and awards ==
Honorary Fellow in Memoriam, National Academy of Kinesiology

Cultural offices
Preceded by Anders Fredrik Skjöldebrand	Swedish Academy, Seat No 18; 1835-1839	Succeeded by Per Daniel Amadeus Atterbom
