= Cat massage =

Massage-therapy techniques applied to domestic cats

Cat massage is a practice used by veterinarians and at home by pet owners to apply massage therapy techniques to domestic cats, primarily for relieving pain and discomfort, as well as a means of strengthening the cat–human bond through intimate interaction.

== Techniques ==
Veterinarians advise that a pet owner apply gentle massages to their cat, and if they wish to give a deeper full-body massage, it is best done by a trained professional. However, a specialist can demonstrate basic techniques for the owner to use at home.

A massage session typically begins with light petting from head to tail, both to relax the cat and to note areas of muscular tension, lumps, swelling, elevated temperature. After the cat has shown that it is relaxed, the owner may employ the effleurage technique: gliding, stroking motions with an open hand and medium pressure, following the muscle contours, and "toward the heart, so from the toes toward the torso, and from the backside toward the head". This is helpful in stimulating circulation of blood and lymph, as well as warming up the soft tissues; it may be effective in relieving edema (swelling caused by fluid build-up) in particular. This may progress to petrissage, a series of kneading and skin-rolling strokes of the skin and muscles, "from the ends of the limbs to the torso and from the tail to the head". This may relieve muscle tension, knots, and spasms. A more advanced technique is tapotement, the use of a rapid series of concussive or percussive medium-firm strokes to tap or carefully "chop" thicker muscles. This is performed using the edge of the hand, with either the fingertips held together or with the hand cupped circularly. (Note: This VCA source only calls the circular-hand style tapotement, but the term actually encompasses all of these percussive techniques.) This technique stimulates muscles and other tissues, increasing blood and lymph circulation. The massage session generally ends with another round of gentle stroking.

== Risks ==
A cat that becomes agitated during a massage may bite or scratch, which can be associated with dangerous infections, such as cat-scratch disease, caused by Pasteurella multocida bacteria, and tenosynovitis, depending on the location and depth of injuries.
