= Jaseng Hospital of Oriental Medicine =

Jaseng Hospital of Korean Medicine
- 자생한방병원(강남)

Geography
- Location: 536 Gangnam-daero, Gangnam-gu, Seoul, South Korea

Organisation
- Type: Specialist

Services
- Speciality: Spine and Joint Disorders, Korean Medicine

History
- Founded: 1988

Links
- Website: www.jaseng.net

Jaseng Hospital of Korean Medicine (Korean: 자생한방병원) is a network of hospitals for non-invasive treatment of spine and joint disorders in South Korea. It was designated as a 'Spine Specialized Oriental Medical Hospital' by the Korea Ministry of Health and also designated as a 'Health Tour' hospital for foreigners by the Korean Health Industry Development Institute (KHIDI).

Jaseng opened in 1988, specializing in Integrative Medicine. With non-invasive treatment methods unique to Jaseng such as Motion Style Acupuncture Treatment (MSAT) and Western therapies, the hospital treats over 250,000 patients a year, equaling a total of 1.6 million treatment sessions. Jaseng is home to 30 specialized clinics with 379 physicians. Over 1,300 inpatient beds are available.

The hospital employs diagnostic equipment, including MRI and CT scanners, in addition to Korean medicine therapies. Physical manual therapy is implemented concurrently to promote healing and to prevent recurrence.

Jaseng has conducted collaborative research with the University of California, Irvine School of Medicine and other US institutions. The honorary chairman of the Jaseng Medical Foundation, Shin, was invited to lecture at the Osteopathic Medical Education Conference (OMED) 2018, the largest osteopathic medical event attended by more than 20,000 US DOs. Michigan State University has incorporated Jaseng's treatment modalities as a CME curriculum since 2015.

The hospital's International Clinic treats more than 2,600 foreign patients annually (including more than 20 ambassadors). The clinic has staff members who speak English, German, Japanese, Mongolian, Arabic, Russian, and Chinese, and language interpretation services are provided. International services include airport transport, assistance with medical documents, online consultations, second opinions, travel and accommodations, insurance claims and local travel.

In 1999, through the hospital accreditation, the educational opportunities expanded to include medical specialty training programs. Continuing medical education at Jaseng serves the purpose of providing accurate diagnosis and standardized treatment for musculoskeletal and degenerative diseases so that each patient can receive safe, least invasive and optimal treatment results.

== History ==
In 1990, Shin Joon-shik founded the Jaseng Oriental Medicine Clinic in Seoul, Korea. The Jaseng Research Institute and the Jaseng Biotechnology Research Institute were established in 1998 and 1999. The clinic was renamed as the Jaseng Hospital of Oriental Medicine and was designated as a 'Health Tour' hospital for foreigners by the Korean Health Industry Development Institute (KHIDI).

In 2001, a nerve regenerating substance called Shinbarometin was found in Jaseng's medicine. Patents for Shinbarometin were acquired in Korea and America, and Green Cross R&D is currently developing it as a natural pharmaceutical so that it can be brought to the global market. The UC Irvine's School of Medicine adopted Korean chuna into the school's curriculum in 2002.

In 2006, the Jaseng Hospital's International Clinic opened. Headed by Raimund Royer, a native of Austria, the international clinic can support English, German, Japanese and Chinese languages. The hospital's website has been translated into English, Japanese and Russian.

In 2007 and 2008, Jaseng volunteered medical services in Uzbekistan, East Timor, Uganda and Mongolia. An affiliation with Al-Azhar University, Egypt, UC Irvine, USA and the Jaseng Hospital of Oriental Medicine was established in 2008.

== Location ==
The main hospital complex is located in Gangnam-gu, Seoul. There are over 20 branch clinics in Bundang, Mokdong, Ilsan, Bucheon, Yeongdeungpo, Suwon, Nowon and more. Outside of Korea, there are 5 Jaseng clinics in California.

== Research ==
Jaseng participates in joint research projects based on scientific proof of oriental medicine with international medical institutions. The research findings are presented at international medical forums and congresses and are published in medical journals.

Joint research with the University of North Carolina demonstrated that integrative Jaseng treatment for lumbar disc herniation displayed a 95% recovery rate. Results of a randomized controlled trial on the pain relieving and functional recovery effects of MSAT for acute low back pain were published in the journal PAIN, and basic research on the effects of Jaseng herbal medicine (i.e. anti-inflammation, nerve regeneration, bone protection, and cartilage protection effects) have been introduced in various SCI(E) journals.

- (2018) Published research paper on 'Impact of 6 acupuncture treatment on the lumbar surgery rate for low back pain in Korea: A nationwide matched retrospective cohort study' in 'PLOS ONE', an international journal equivalent to SCI
- (2018) Published research paper on 'The anti-inflammatory Effects of Shinbaro3 Is Mediated by Downregulation of the TLR4 Signalling Pathway in LPS-Stimulated RAW 264.7 Macrophages', an international journal equivalent to SCI in the field of inflammation management. The paper was later retracted at the authors request due to concerns over reliability of the experiment.
- (2017) Scientifically proved that there was a reduction in pain after 8 weeks of Korean medicine treatment in patients with spinal stenosis – published on SCI(E) Grade International Journal, BMC Evidence-Based Complementary and Alternative Medicine Journal
- (2017) Proved the long-term effect of Korean Medicine Treatment on patients whose disc was re-absorbed – SCI(E) Grade International Journal Evidence-Based Complementary and Alternative Medicine Journal
- (2017) Proved clinical effects of Integrative Korean Medicine Treatment for patients with Failed Back Surgery Syndrome – published in SCI(E) Grade International Academic Journal, PLOS ONE.
- (2016) Proved the anti-inflammatory effect of Shinbaro pharmacopuncture and cartilage protection – published in SCI grade international academic journal 'Chinese Medicine'
- (2016) 95% of patients with cervical disc herniation who received an integrative treatment of Korean medicine were satisfied with their results after 21 months – published in SCI grade Academic Journal BMC CAM
- (2013) A paper on the validation of the analgesic effects of Motion Style Acupuncture Treatment (MSAT) is published in PAIN. It is the first paper to confirm the effects of acupuncture on acute low back pain
- (2012) The cartilage regeneration effects of Chungpa-jun is published in evidence-based Complementary and Alternative Medicine
- (2010) Results of a joint research with North Carolina University 'Bone mineral density, body mass index, postmenopausal period and outcomes of low back pain treatment in Korean postmenopausal women' published in Eur Spine J
- (2010) Anti-inflammatory effects of 'Chungpa-jun', an herbal medicine unique to Jaseng, is validated in an article published in the Journal of Ethnopharmacology (Impact Factor 2.322)
- (2009) The Journal of Physiological Sciences published the joint study titled 'Spinal cholinergic mechanism of the relieving effects of electroacupuncture on cold and warm allodynia in a rat model of neuropathic pain'
- (2007) Harvard Medical School published thesis on Jaseng's non-surgical spinal treatment in the Journal of Alternative & Complementary Medicine.
- (2005) 'The Effect of Bee Venom Acupuncture' joint research was published in The Journal of Ethno pharmacology
- (2004) 'The Effect of Yook-gong-dan', thesis was published in the International Journal of Neuroscience
- (2004) 'Association of Interleukin 10 Haplotype with Low Bone Mineral Density in Korean Postmenopausal Women', published in the Journal of Biochemistry and Molecular Biology.
- (2001) 'The Effect of Chuna Treatment for Patients with Herniated Intervertebral Disc of Lumbar Spine' published in The Journal of Korea CHUNA Manual Medicine.

== Awards ==
- 2008 Awarded for Oriental Medicine at the Korea Health Industry Awards
- 2007 Awarded the Korea's Best Leadership Prize by Dale Carnegie Training (Korea)
