= August Falise =

Dutch sculptor and medailleur

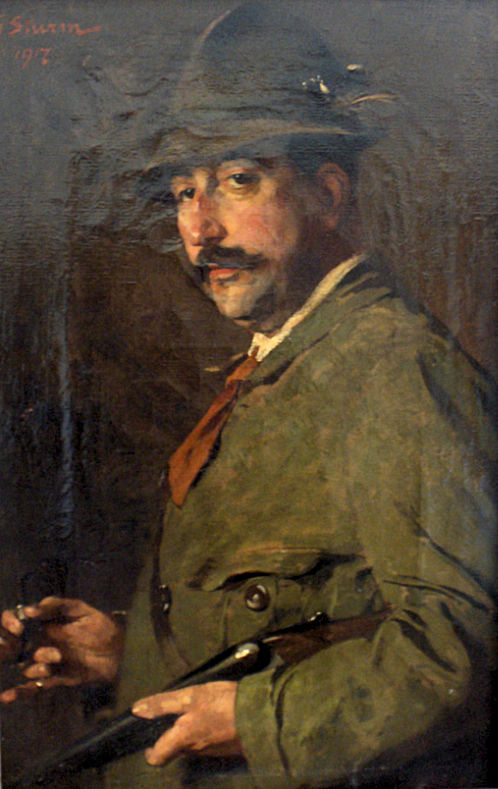
- August Falise painted by Georg Sturm, 1917
- Born: Augustinus Franciscus Henri Falise; 26 January 1875; Wageningen, Netherlands
- Died: 6 January 1936 (aged 60); Wageningen, Netherlands
- Education: Rijksakademie
- Known for: sculpting

Augustinus Franciscus Henri Falise (26 January 1875 – 7 January 1936) was a Dutch sculptor and medailleur (minter of medals). Next to smaller sculptures he designed large monuments of public figures in stone or messing which are still present in many towns in the Netherlands.

== Biography ==
Falise was born on 26 January 1875 in Wageningen. He descended from a French/Belgian family of plasterers that had settled in Wageningen. He was a teacher of anatomic drawings and modelling at the AKV St. Joost in 's-Hertogenbosch. In 1912 he moved in Wageningen into the house Antonia. The street where he lived, was partially renamed in 1941 to August Faliseweg. He was married to Antoinette Hof; the marriage was childless. Falise won many prizes and received Dutch and international awards. In 1936 the award of the Order of St. Gregory the Great and the Belgium Order of the Crown (Belgium).

== Exhibitions ==
The Museum De Casteelse Poort in Wageningen organized an exhibition about August Falise from 18 June 2010 until 20 February 2011. This exhibition attracted substantial regional media attention and led to renewed interest in the once famous Dutch sculptor.

== Work ==
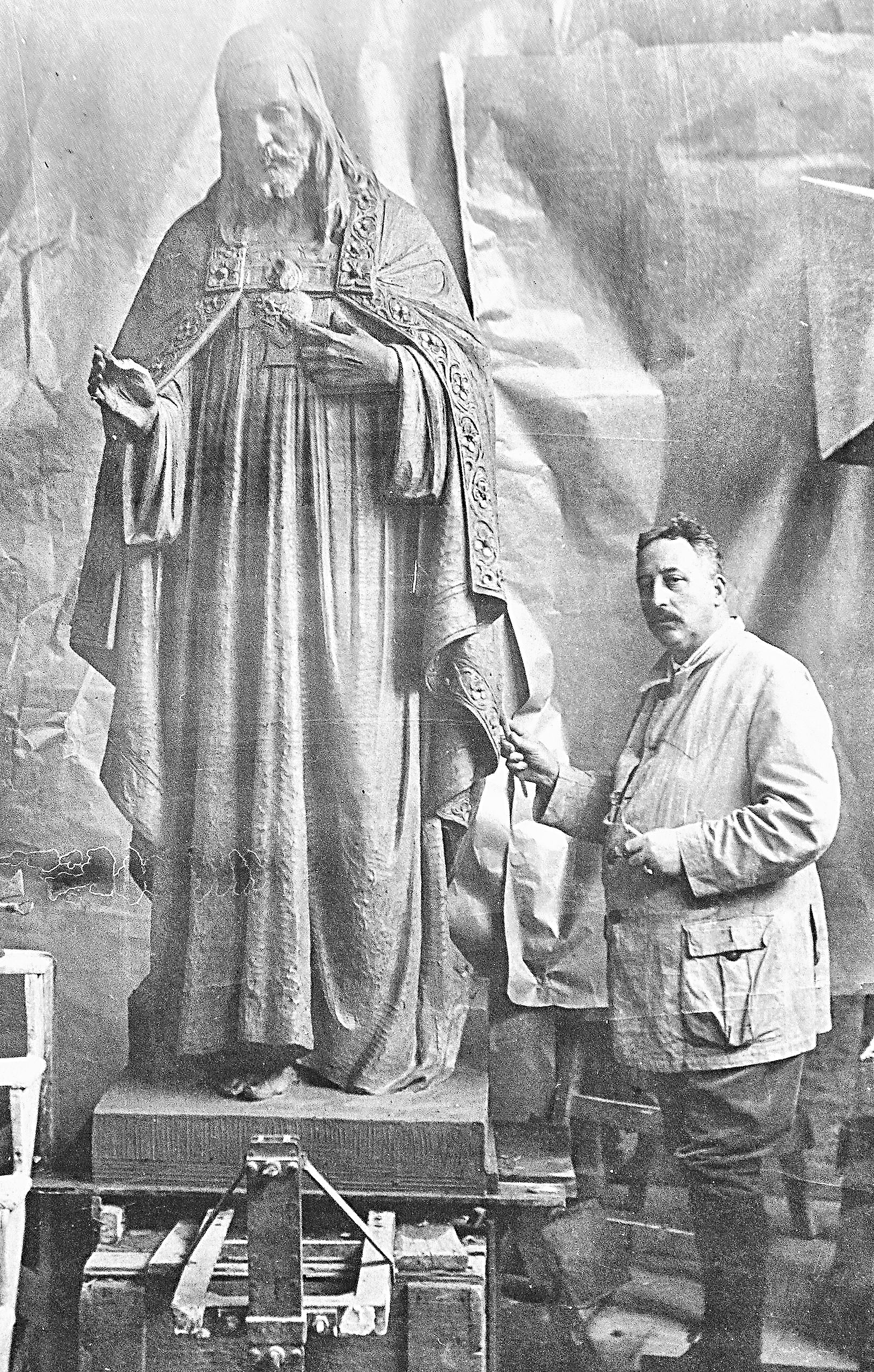
August Falise with one of his statues

Statues that can be seen in public space:

- 1910 – Johann Georg Mezger, 't Groentje, Domburg
- 1911 – Johan van Oldenbarnevelt, Stationsplein, Amersfoort, in 1933 verplaatst naar de tuin van het Stedelijk Gymnasium Johan van Oldenbarnevelt
- 1919 – Lodewijk Thomson, Groningen, since 2003 a replica in Durrës, Albania; second replica since 28 June 2014 in the Senate building at the Binnenhof in The Hague
- 1921 – Heilig Hartbeeld, Keulsepoort, Venlo
- 1926 – Thomas Aquinas, Comeniuslaan (bij aula Radboud Universiteit); 1946: Wilhelminasingel, Nijmegen (onthulling 1 juni 1926)
- 1926 – De Zaaier (The Sower), Herenstraat, Wageningen (unveiled 14 September 1926; moved to Costerweg in 1990, and to Droevendaalsesteeg in 2012)
- 1927 – Dr. Herman Schaepman, Es, Tubbergen (onthulling 11 augustus 1927)
- 1927 – Mr. Wiardus Willem van Haersma Buma, Emmen (onthulling 5 oktober 1927)
- 1928 – Willem Emmens, tegen over Hoofdstraat 29, Zeijen. (onthulling mei 1929 te Emmen
- 1929 – Jan Morks, Molenwater, Middelburg (onthulling 20 augustus 1929)
- 1930 – P.J.H. Cuypers, Munsterkerk, Roermond (onthulling 10 juni 1930)
- 1930 – Hieronymus Bosch, Markt, 's-Hertogenbosch (onthulling 17 juni 1930)
- 1933 – Borstbeeld van Joannes Benedictus van Heutsz in Coevorden (onthulling 8 juli 1933 door prins-gemaal Prince Henry, Duke of Mecklenburg-Schwerin)
- 1934 – Dr. Alfons Ariëns, Ariënsplein, Enschede (onthulling 16 juni 1934)
- 1934 – Kardinaal Van Rossum, Kardinaal van Rossumplein, 's-Hertogenbosch (onthulling 24 juni 1934)

Source: www.vanderkrogt.net

Some medallions designed by August Falise:

- Medallion at the occasion of the birth of Princess Juliana with the portraits of Queen Wilhelmina and Prince Hendrik, April 1909
- Honorary Medal of the Municipality of Arnhem
- Honorary Medal of the City of Amsterdam
- Medallion of composer and musician Gustaaf Adolf Heinze
- The three Graces

== Gallery ==
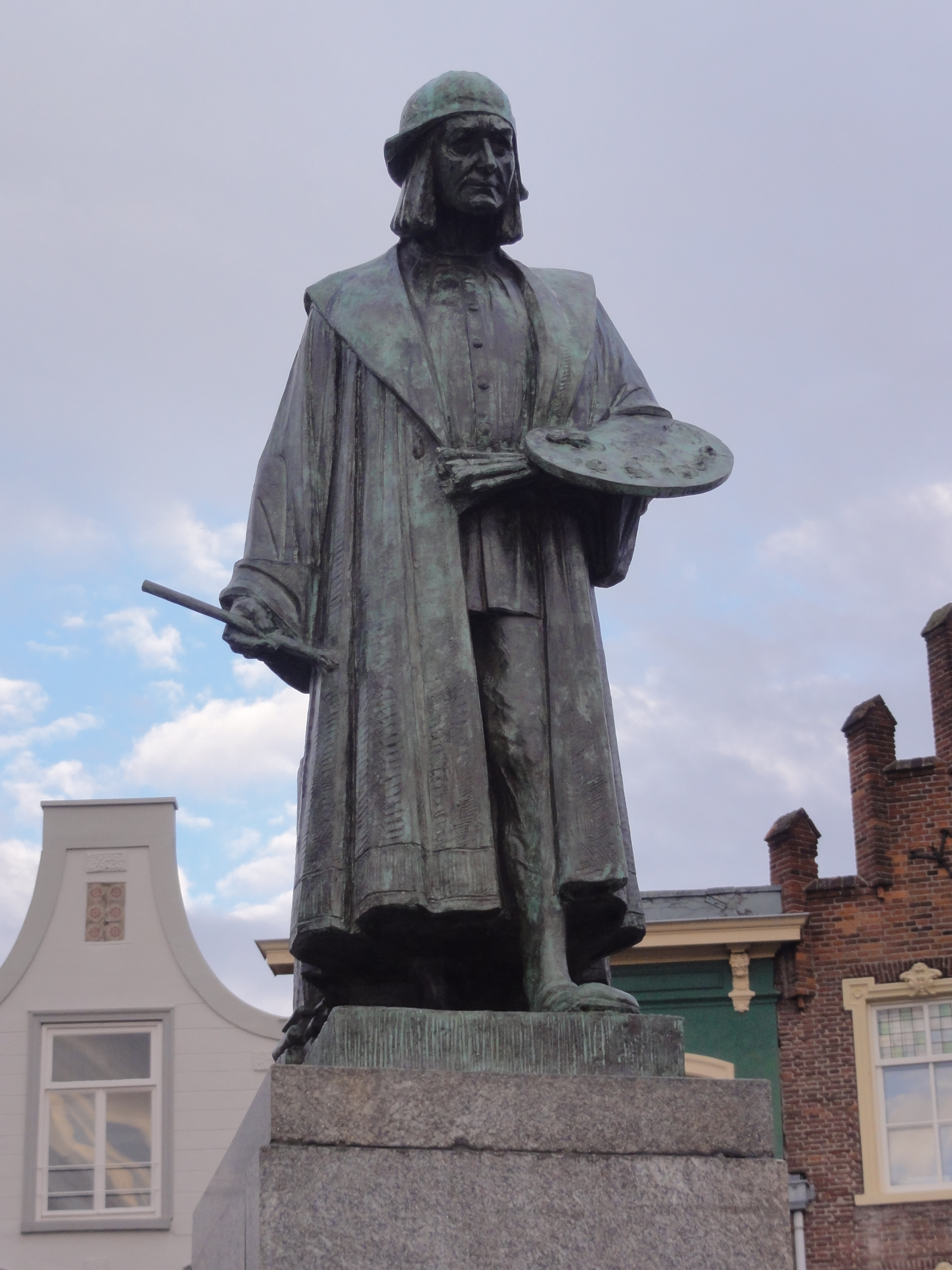
Jeroen Bosch
('s-Hertogenbosch)

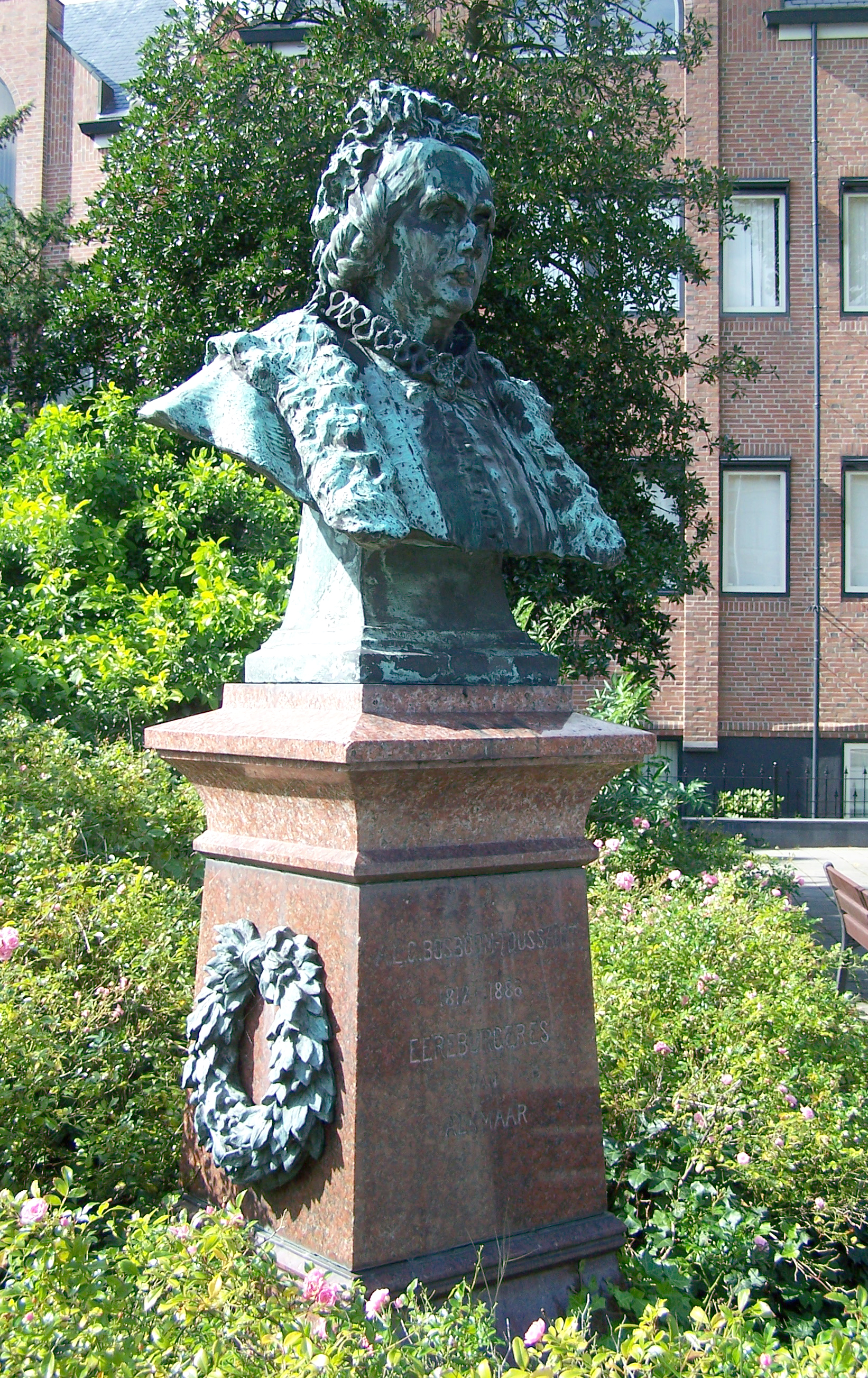
Bosboom-Toussaint, 1912
(Alkmaar)

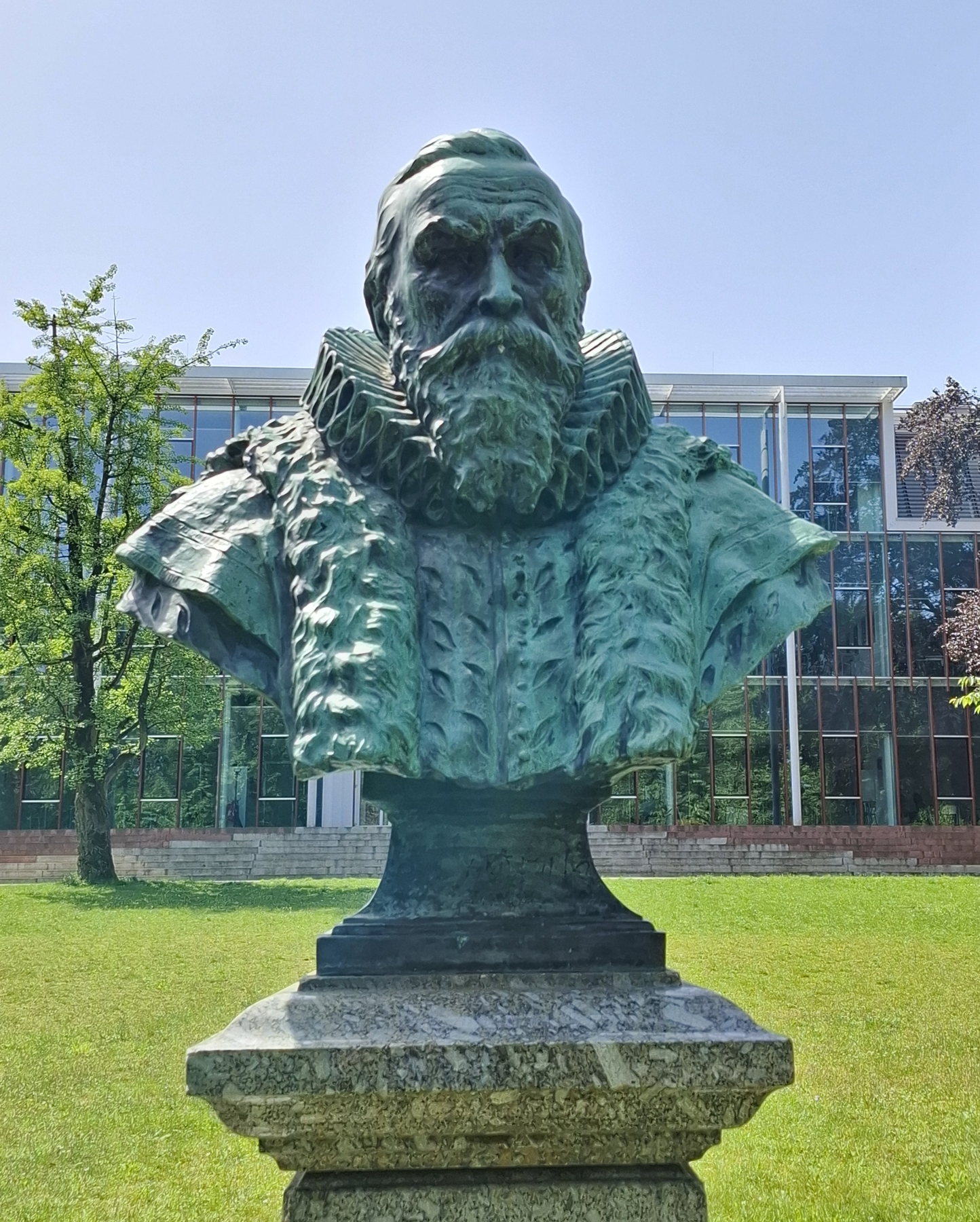
Johan van Oldenbarnevelt
(Amersfoort)

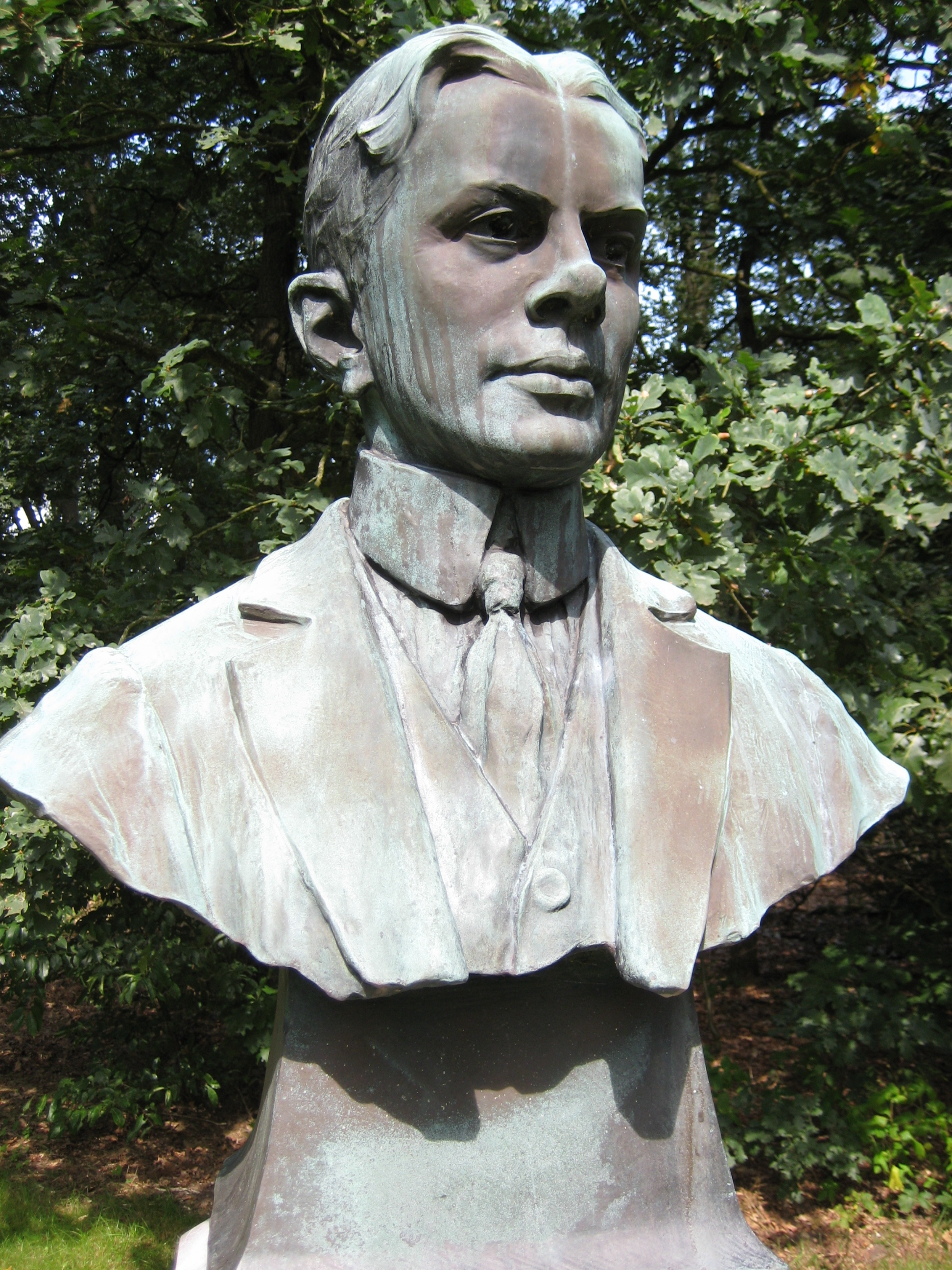
Clément van Maasdijk
(Arnhem)

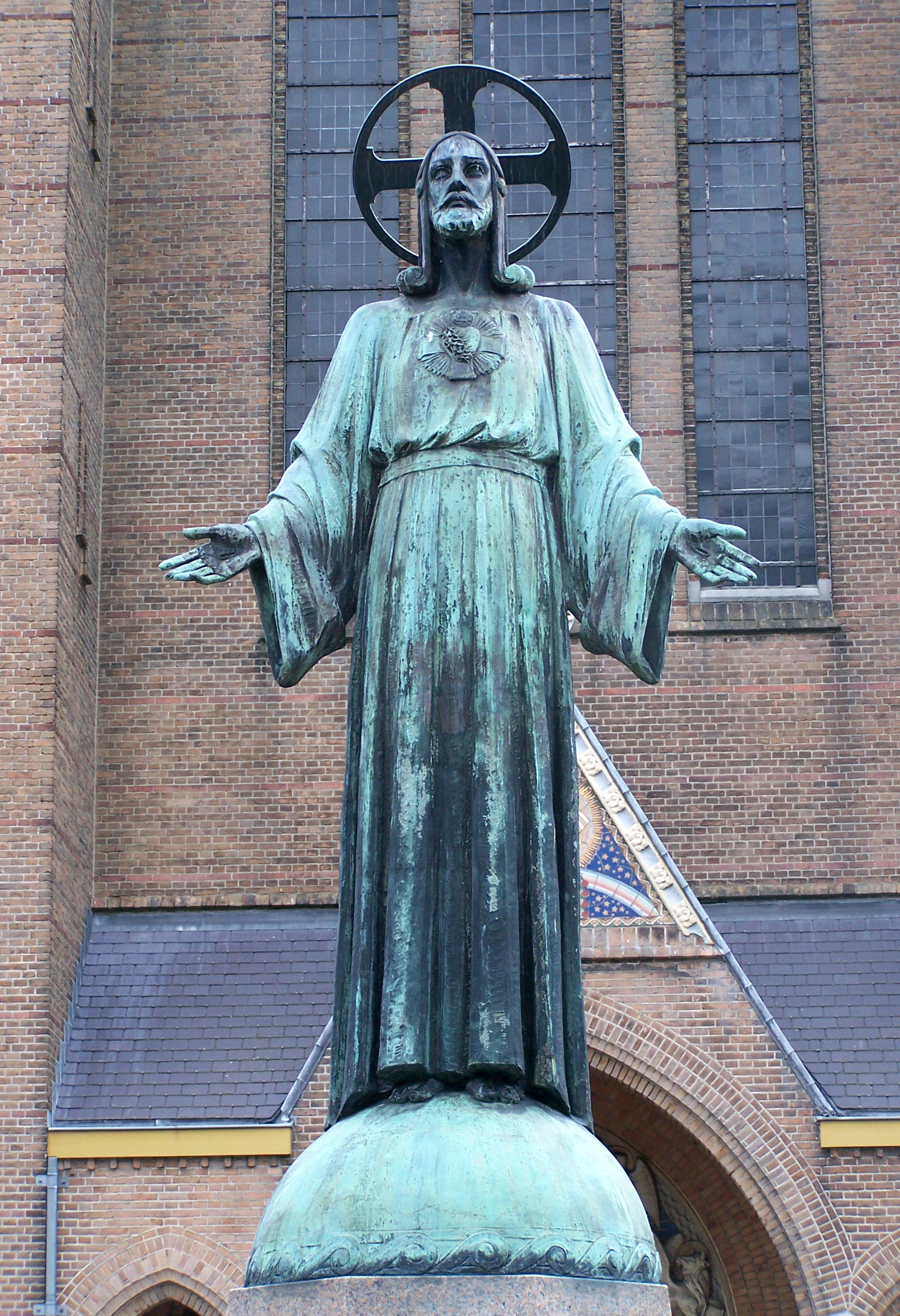
Christus Heilig Hart, 1926
(Breda)

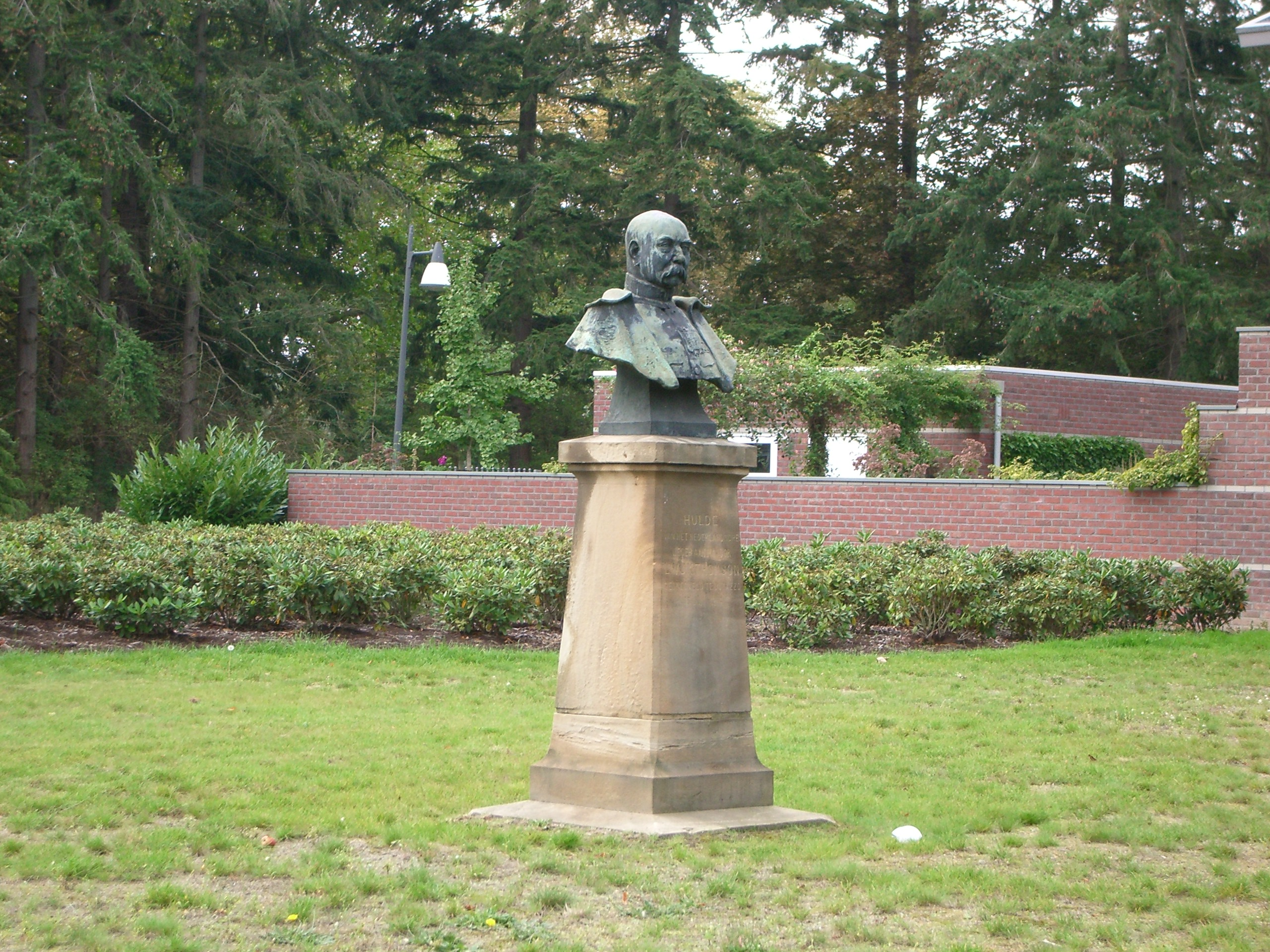
Lodewijk Thomson
(Groningen)

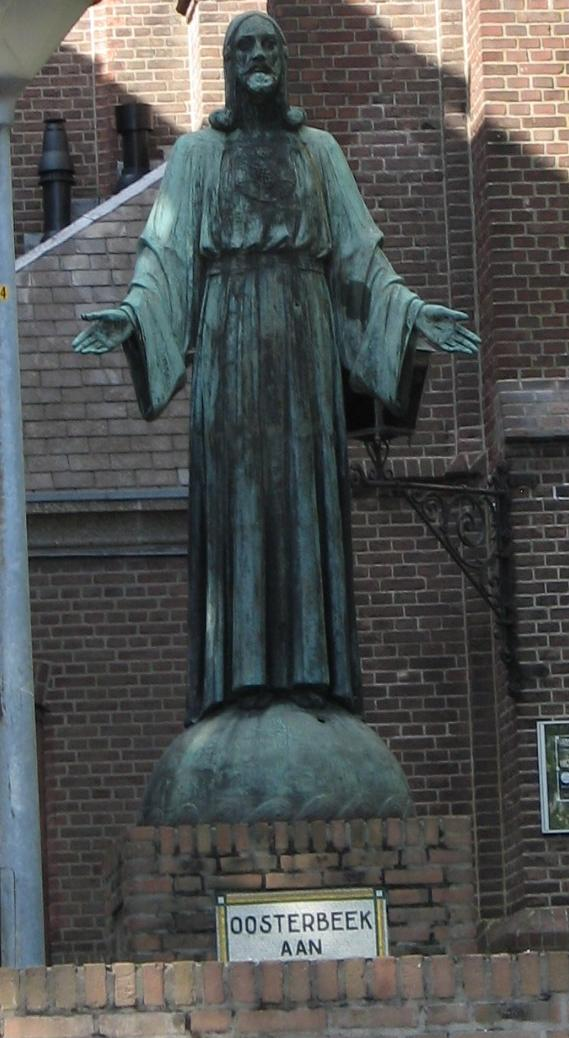
Christus Heilig Hart
(Oosterbeek)

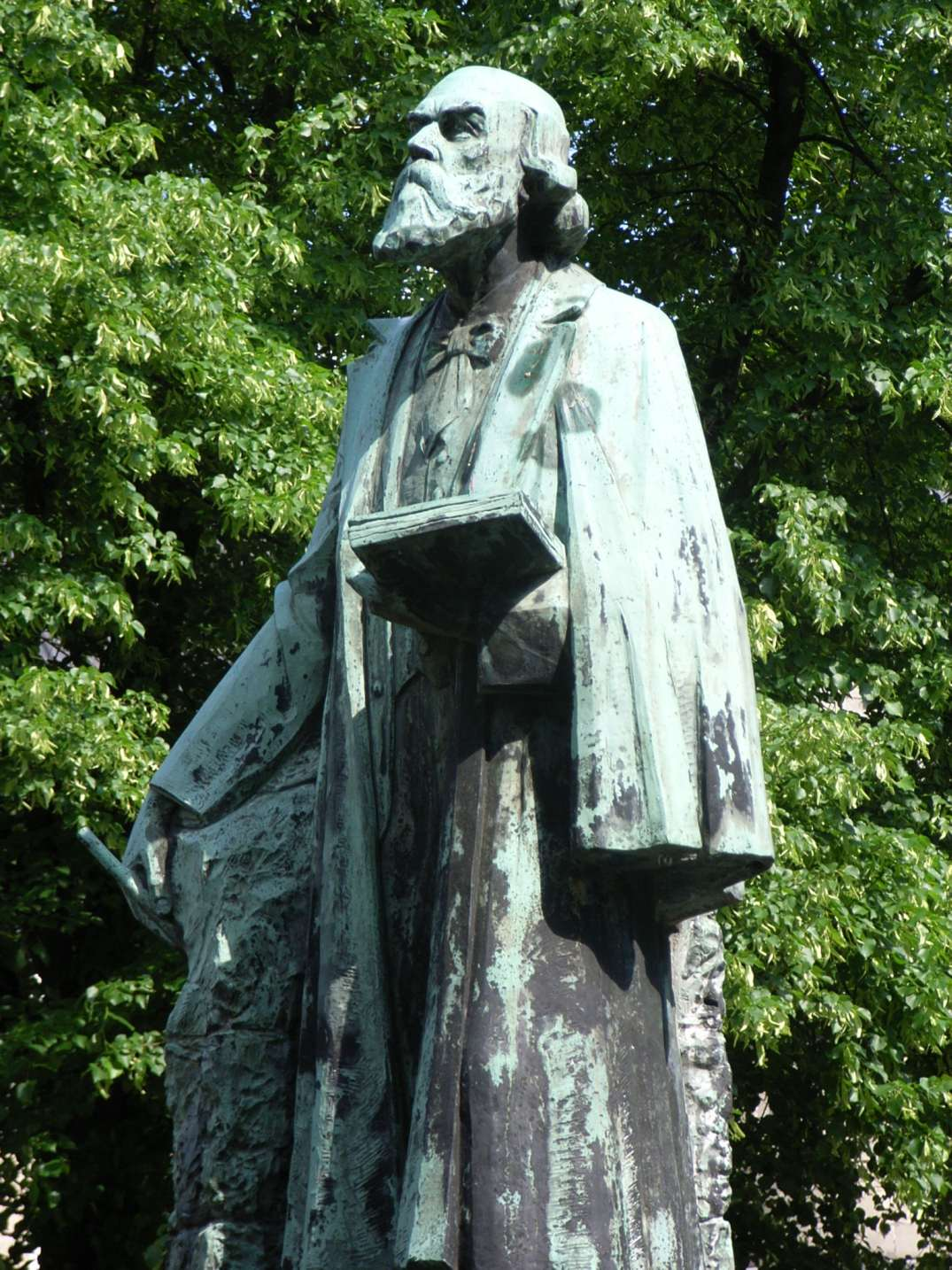
Statue Pierre Cuypers
(Roermond)

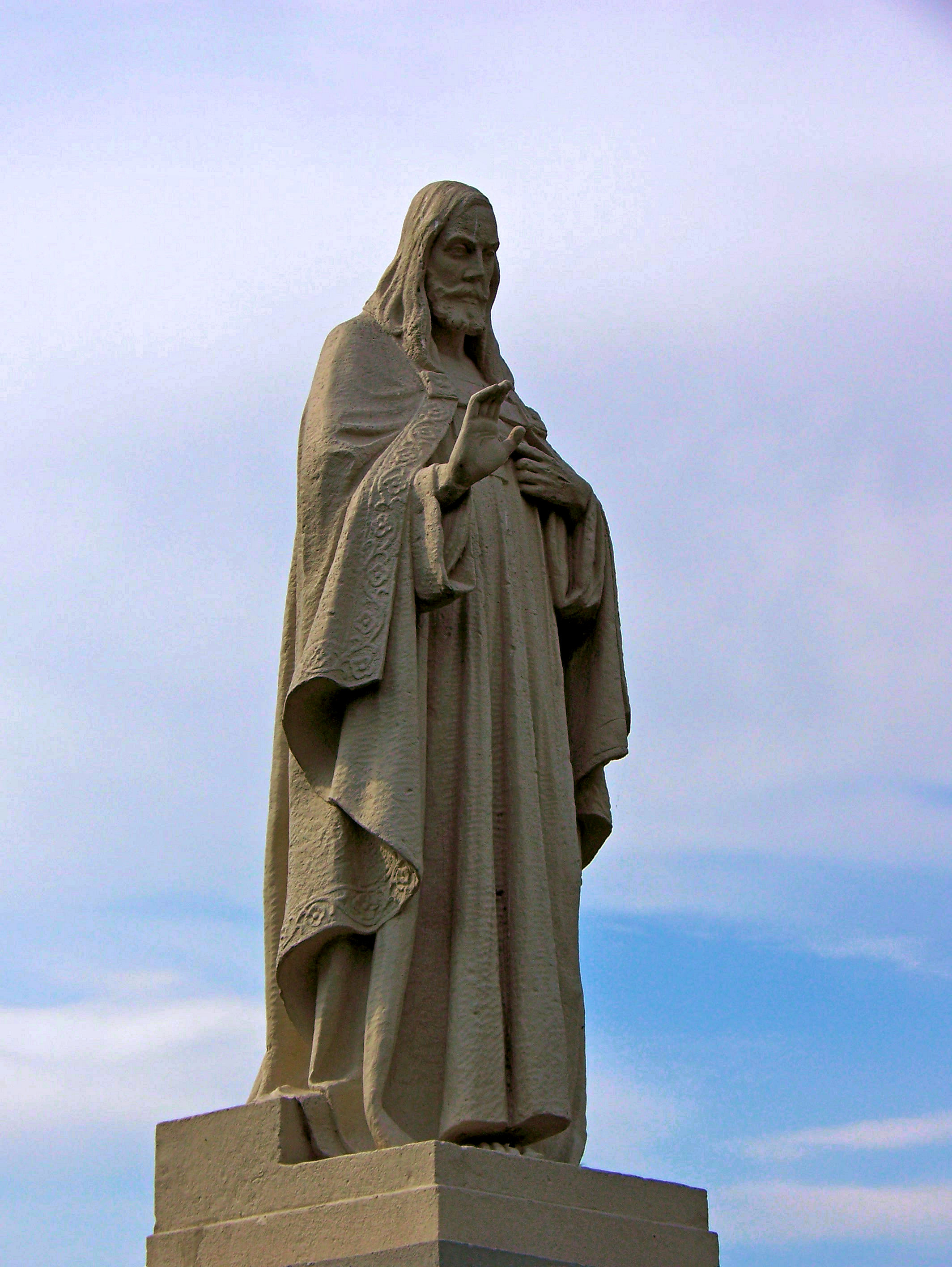
Christus Heilig Hart
(Sappermeer)

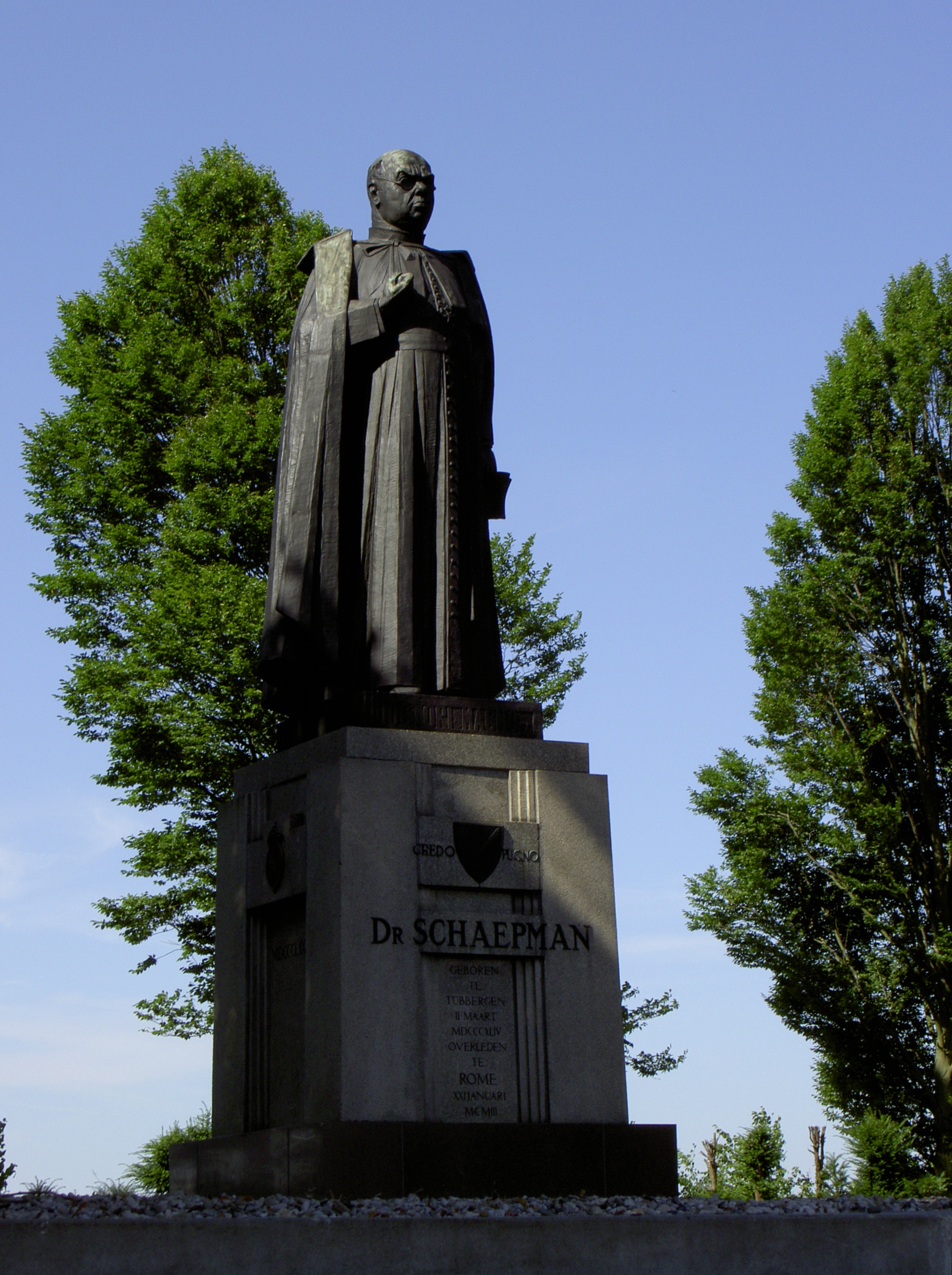
Dr. Herman Schaepman
(Tubbergen)

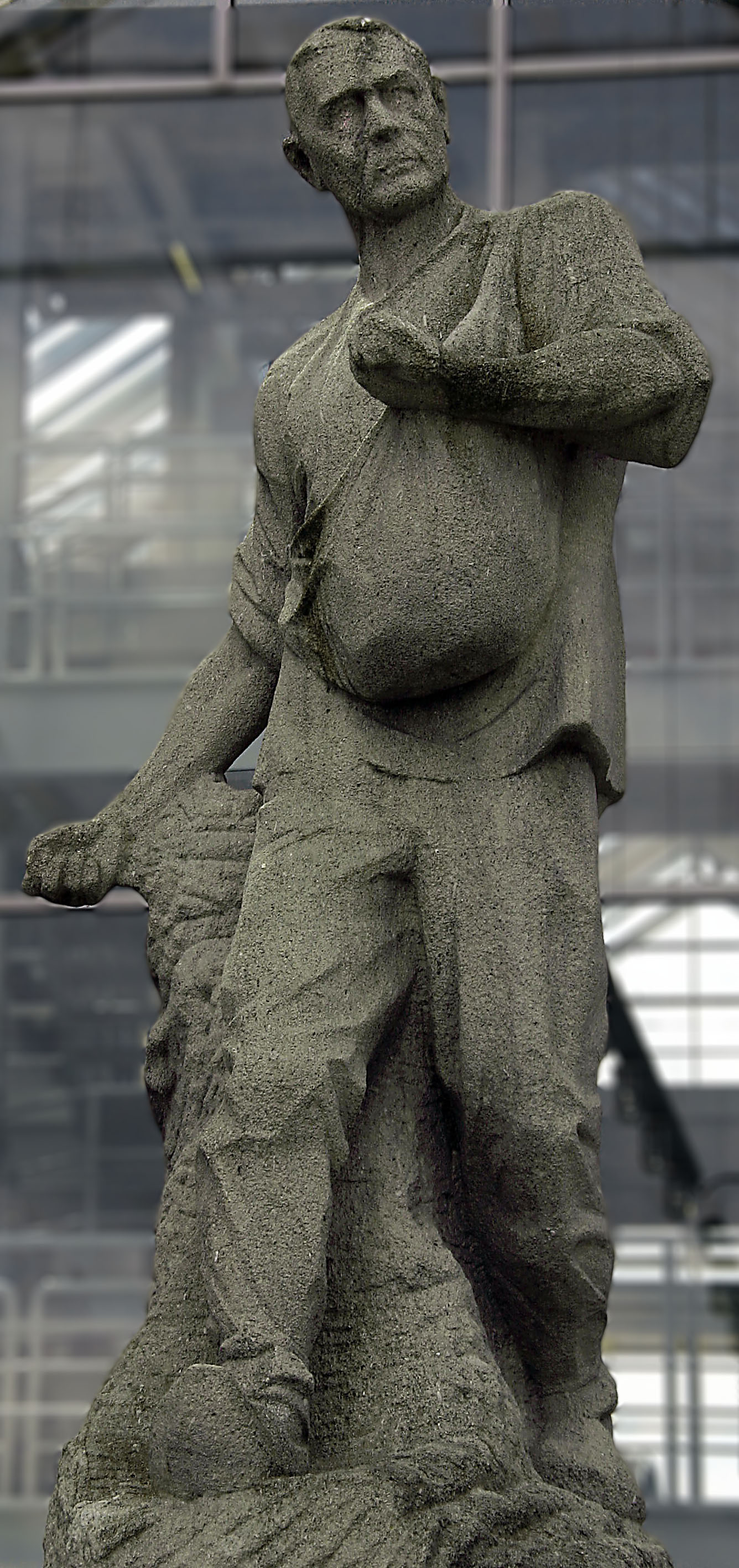
De zaaier
(Wageningen)

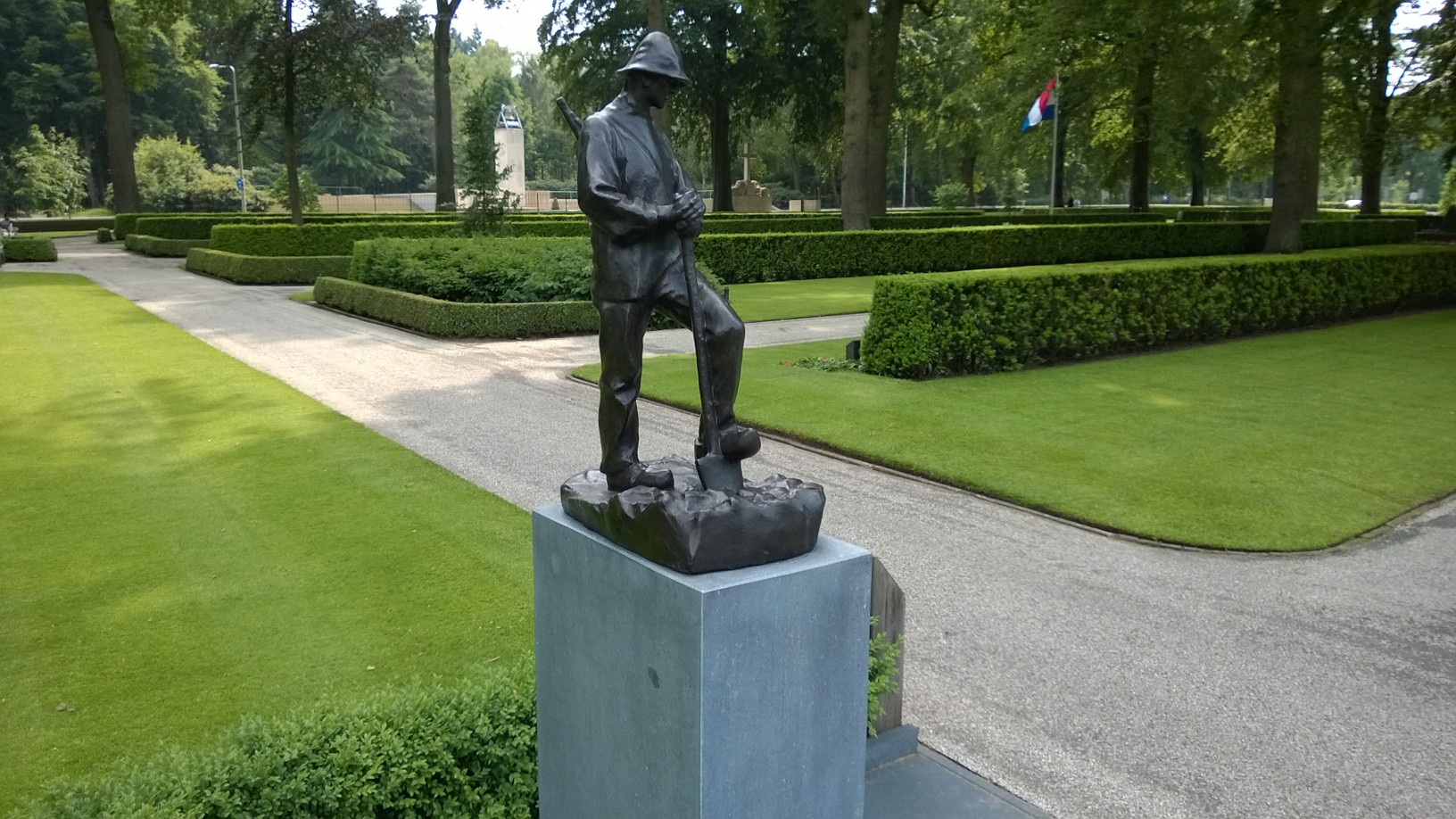
Monument Vrijwillige Landstorm (Rhenen); replica by Roel van der Burg of sculpture destroyed in World War II
