= Tui na =

Traditional Chinese massage therapy

- "Tui na" in Chinese characters

Chinese name
- Chinese: 推拿
- Literal meaning: "Push and grasp"
Transcriptions
Standard Mandarin
- Hanyu Pinyin: tuīná
- Wade–Giles: t'uei^{1}-na^{2}
- IPA: [tʰwéɪ.nǎ]
Yue: Cantonese
- Yale Romanization: tēui-nàah
- Jyutping: teoi^{1}-naa^{4}
- IPA: [tʰɵɥ˥.na˩]

Min name
- Chinese: 掠龍
Transcriptions
Southern Min
- Hokkien POJ: lia̍h-lêng
- Tâi-lô: lia̍h-lîng

Korean name
- Hangul: 추나
- Hanja: 推拏
Transcriptions
- Revised Romanization: chu na
- McCune–Reischauer: ch'una

Tui na ([tʰwéɪ.nǎ]; Chinese: 推拿) is a form of alternative medicine similar to shiatsu. As a branch of traditional Chinese medicine, it is often used in conjunction with acupuncture, moxibustion, fire cupping, Chinese herbalism, tai chi or other Chinese internal martial arts, and qigong.

== Background ==
Tui na is a hands-on body treatment that uses Chinese Daoist principles in an effort to bring the eight principles of traditional Chinese medicine into balance. The practitioner may brush, knead, roll, press, and rub the areas between each of the joints, known as the eight gates, to attempt to open the body's defensive qi (wei qi) and get the energy moving in the meridians and the muscles. Techniques may be gentle or quite firm. The name comes from two of the actions: tui means "to push" and na means "to lift and squeeze." Other strokes include shaking and tapotement. The practitioner can then use a range of motion, traction, and the stimulation of acupressure points. These techniques are claimed to aid in the treatment of both acute and chronic musculoskeletal conditions, as well as many non-musculoskeletal conditions.

As with many other traditional Chinese medical practices, different schools vary in their approach to the discipline. In traditional Korean medicine it is known as chu na (推拏), and it is related also to Japanese massage or anma and its derivatives shiatsu and sekkotsu. In the West, tui na is taught as a part of the curriculum at some acupuncture schools.

== Pediatric Tui na ==
Pediatric Tui na (Chinese: 小儿推拿; pinyin: xiǎo'ér tuīná) is a specialized branch of Tui na adapted for infants and children, typically up to twelve years of age. It relies on the same foundational principles as adult Tui na but utilizes different techniques and acupoints based on traditional Chinese medicine (TCM) views of pediatric physiology.

According to TCM theory, a child's internal organ systems (Zang-Fu)—particularly the lung, spleen, and kidney systems—are considered delicate and immature. TCM texts describe children as having an incomplete development of Yin and Yang, making their balance more fragile but also allowing for a faster physiological response to treatment.

Because a child's skin and soft tissues are more delicate, practitioners use strokes that are generally lighter, faster, and more gentle than those used on adults. Furthermore, pediatric Tui na relies heavily on specific acupoints and linear zones that are unique to children. These points are primarily concentrated on the hands, forearms, abdomen, and back. Common techniques include:

- Gentle downward or upward brushing on specific meridians (such as the spleen or stomach meridians on the thumb and palm).
- Circular kneading (揉, róu) on the fleshy parts of the hands or joints.
- Spinal rolling (捏脊, niējǐ), which involves lightly pinching and rolling the skin along the spine from the lower back up towards the neck.

In TCM clinical practice, pediatric Tui na is commonly applied with the intent of addressing digestive imbalances (such as indigestion or poor appetite), respiratory issues, and for general wellness. Practitioners often advise against its use for children with infectious diseases, fractures, open wounds, or bleeding disorders.

== Efficacy ==
A collaborative study between researchers in China and Germany concluded that the use of Tui na techniques can be a safe, low-cost method to reduce back and neck pain.

== See also ==
- Chin na
- Dit Da
- Gua Sha
- Naprapathy
- Pushing hands
- Dim Mak
- Varma Kalai
- Acupressure
