= Abraham Jacob van der Aa =

Dutch writer and academic

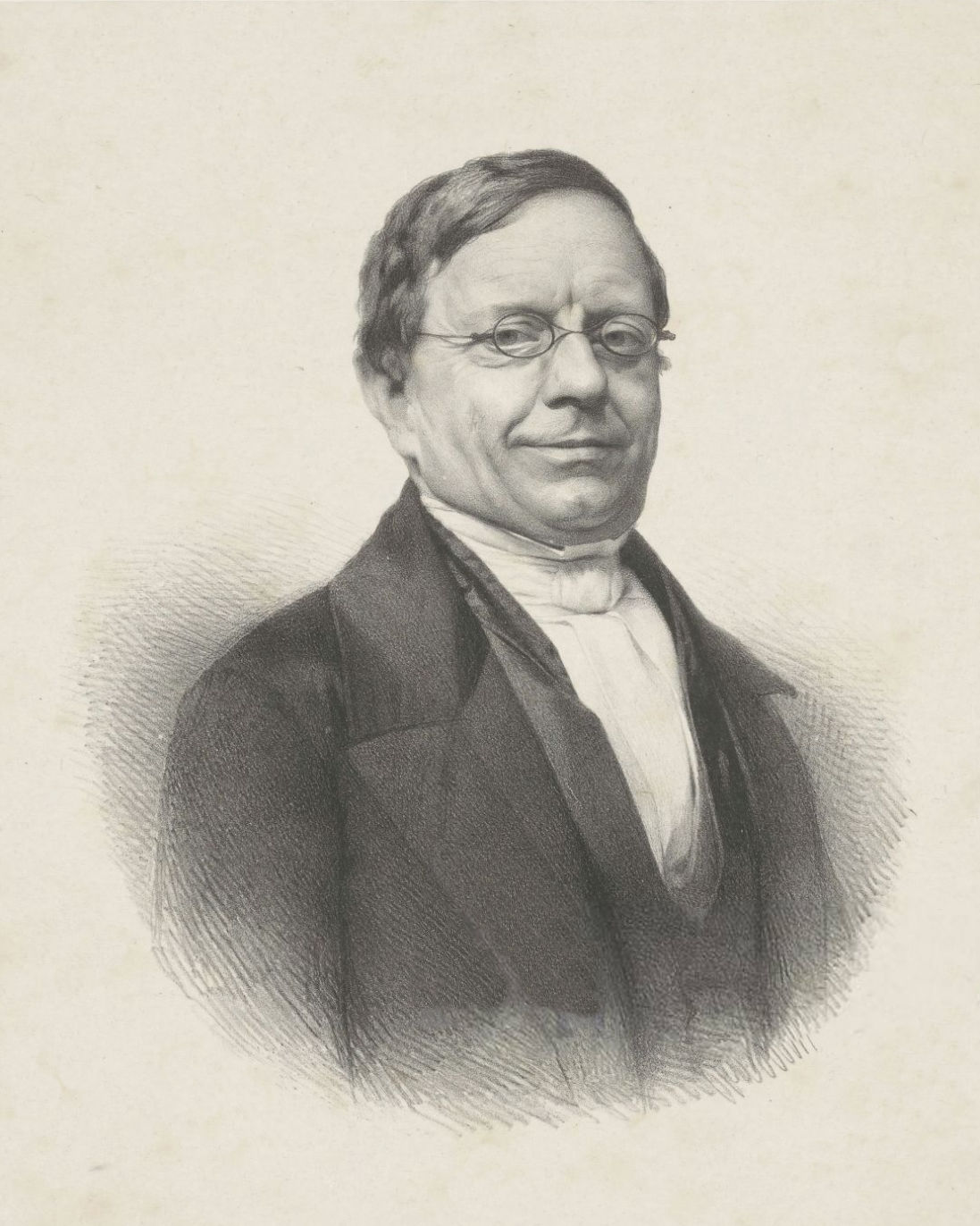
Abraham Jacob van der Aa, portrait by Adrianus Johannes Ehnle

Abraham Jacob van der Aa (7 December 1792 – 21 March 1857) was a Dutch writer best known for his dictionaries, one of notable people and the other of notable places in the Netherlands.

He was born in Amsterdam in 1792. His father was a lawyer. From the ages of 6 to 12, he visited the dayschool in Amstelveen. After that, he was sent to the boarding school of J.E. van Iterson in Aarlanderveen but only stayed there for a year. After a short stay at the Latin school in Leiden, where his parents lived at that time, he was sent to the Seminarium in Lingen, Germany to study the "dead languages".

After his return in 1810, he went to medical school in Leiden, but had to leave after his father's death. He later did his mandatory military service until 1817. At that point, he tried to open a bookshop in Leuven, but this was not a success so he became a teacher in the Dutch language. After 1839, he moved to Gorinchem, where he wrote several reference works, including a gazetteer and a biographical dictionary, Biographisch woordenboek der Nederlanden.

The Aardrijkskundig Woordenboek der Nederlanden (Geographical dictionary of the Netherlands) was a 14-volume gazetteer, published between 1839 and 1851. It was written with the help of many regional historians and other geographers. It covers the Netherlands, Luxembourg, and the former Dutch colonies. Until his death in 1857 from undisclosed causes at age 64 in Gorinchem he continued working on his "biographic dictionary".

== Works ==
- Aardrijkskundig Woordenboek van Noord-Brabant (Breda, 1832);
- Herinneringen uit het gebied der geschiedenis (Amsterdam 1835);
- Nieuwe herinneringen (Amsterdam 1837);
- Geschied- en aardrijkskundige beschrijving van het koninkrijk der Nederlanden en het groothertogdom Luxemburg (Gorinchem 1841);
- Nieuw biographisch, anthologisch en critisch woordenboek van Nederlandsche dichters (Amsterdam 1844-1846);
- Geschiedkundig beschrijving van Breda (Gorinchem 1845);
- Nederlandsch Oost-Indië (Amsterdam en Breda 1846-'57), 4 delen;
- Beschrijving van den Krimpener en den Loopikerwaard, Schoonh. 1847;
- Nederland, handboekje voor reizigers, Amsterdam 1849;
- Lotgevallen van Willem Heenvliet, Amsterdam 1851;
- Biographisch Woordenboek der Nederlanden, Haarlem 1852-'78;
- Beknopt Aardrijkskundig Woordenboek der Nederlanden, Gorinchem 1851-'54;
- Bloemlezing uit [Van Effen's] Spectator, in Klassiek en Letterkundig Pantheon 1855, 2 delen;
- Parelen uit de lettervruchten van Nederl. dichteressen, Amsterdam 1856;
- Ons Vaderland en zijne bewoners, Amsterdam 1855-'57.
