= Anna Louisa Geertruida Bosboom-Toussaint =

Dutch novelist

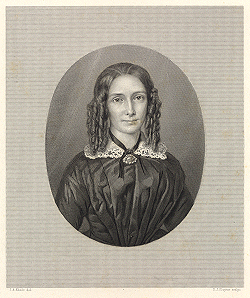
- A portrait of Bosboom-Toussaint by J.A. Ehnle and D.J. Sluyter
- Born: Anna Louisa Geertruida Toussaint; September 16, 1812; Alkmaar, Netherlands
- Died: April 14, 1886 (aged 73); The Hague, Netherlands
- Writing career
- Genres: Historical romance, society novel

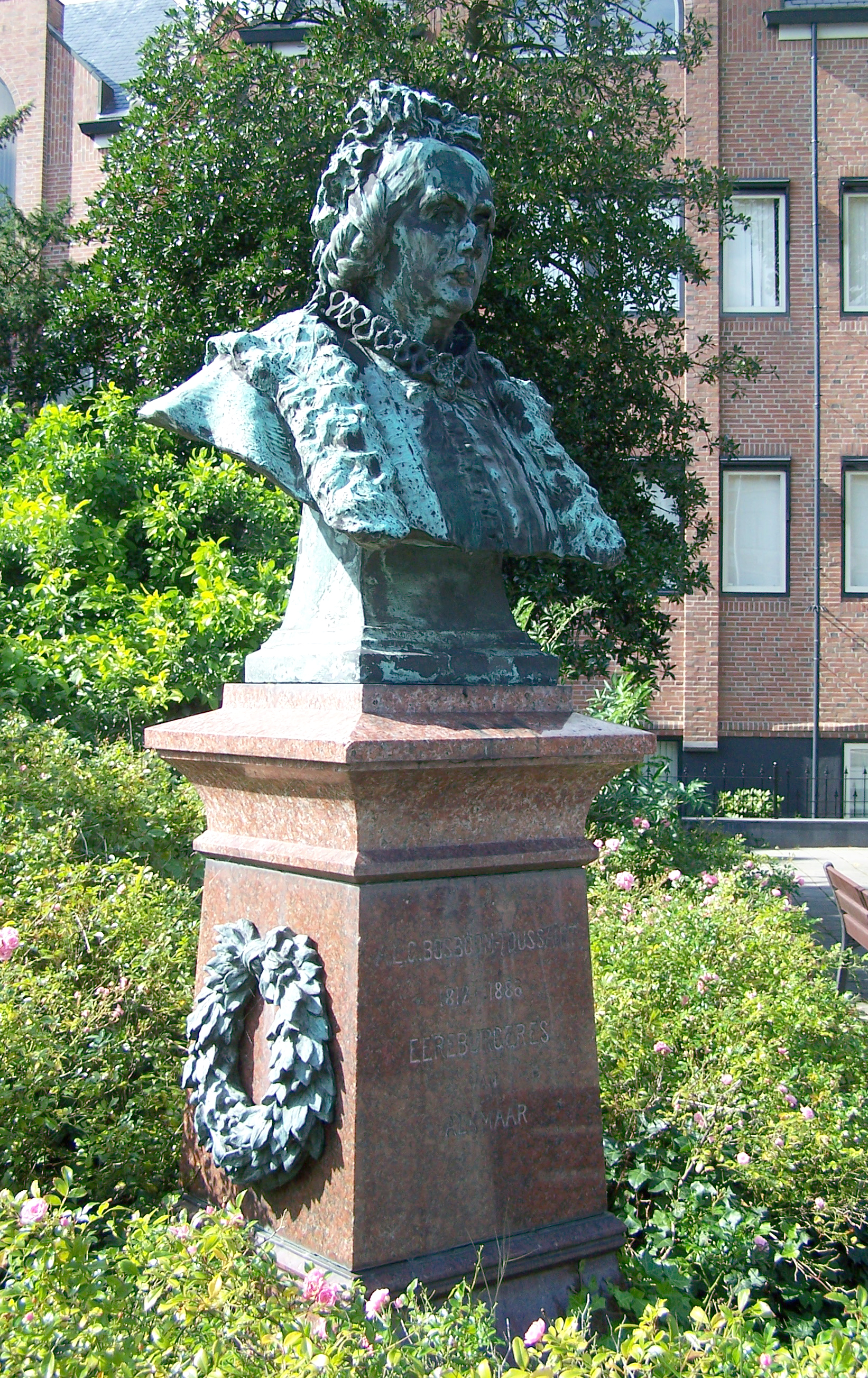
Bust of Bosboom-Toussaint in Alkmaar (by August Falise, 1912).

Anna Louisa Geertruida Bosboom-Toussaint (September 16, 1812 – April 14, 1886) was a Dutch novelist.

== Life and career ==
Geertruida Toussaint was born in Alkmaar, Netherlands, on 16 September 1812. Her father, a pharmacist of Huguenot descent, gave her a fair education, and at an early period of her career she developed a taste for historical research, fostered by a forced indoor life as a result of weak health.

Her first romance, Almagro, appeared in 1837, followed by De graaf van Devonshire ("The Earl of Devonshire") in 1838; De Engelschen te Rome ("The English at Rome") in 1840, and Het Huis Lauernesse ("The House of Lauernesse") in 1841, an episode of the Reformation that was translated into many European languages. These stories, mainly founded upon some of the most interesting epochs of Dutch history, betrayed a remarkable grasp of facts and situations, combined with an undoubted mastery over her mother tongue, although her style is sometimes involved and not always faultless.

Toussaint spent 1840 to 1850 carrying out further studies, resulting in an 1851-1854 series of three novels dealing with the first Earl of Leicester's adventures in the Low Countries: Leycester in Nederland (3 vols.), Vrouwen van het Leycestersche Tydperk (Women of Leicester's Epoch, 3 vols.), and Gideon Florensz (3 vols.). In 1851 she married the Dutch painter, Johannes Bosboom (1817–1891), after which she was known as Mrs Bosboom-Toussaint.

After 1870 Geertruida Bosboom-Toussaint abandoned historical romance for the modern society novel, but her Delftsche Wonderdokter ("The Necromancer of Delft", 1871) and Majoor Frans ("Major Frank", 1875) did not achieve the success of her earlier works. Majoor Frans was translated into English (1885). Her novels were published in a collected edition (1885–1888, 25 vols.). She died in The Hague on 14 April 1886.

== Works ==
Geertruida Bosboom-Toussaint as drawn by her husband Johannes Bosboom.

- Almagro (1837)
- De Graaf van Devonshire: romantische épisode uit de jeugd van Elisabeth Tudor ("The Earl of Devonshire, Romantic Episode from Elisabeth Tudor's Youth", 1838)
- Engelschen te Rome: romantische épisode uit de regering van paus Sixtus V ("The English at Rome, Romantic Episode from Pope Sixtus V's Reign", 1839)
- Het huis Lauernesse ("The House of Lauernesse", 1840)
- Lord Edward Glenhouse (1840)
- De prinses Orsini ("The Princess of Orsini", 1843)
- Eene kroon voor Karel den Stouten ("A Crown for Charles the Bold", 1842)
- De graaf van Leycester in Nederland ("The Earl of Leicester in the Netherlands", 1846)
- Mejonkvrouwe De Mauléon ("Lady De Mauléon", 1848)
- Don Abbondio II (1849)
- Het huis Honselaarsdijk in 1638 ("The House of Honselaarsdijk in 1638", 1849)
- De vrouwen van het Leycestersche tijdvak ("The Women of the Leicesterean Era", 1850)
- Media-Noche: een tafereel uit den Nijmeegschen vredehandel, 1678 ("Media Noche, a Tableau from the Nijmegen Peace Trade", 1852)
- Gideon Florensz: romantisch-historische épisode uit het laatste tijdperk van Leycesters bestuur in Nederland ("Gideon Florensz, a Romantic-Historical Episode from the Last of Leicester's Administration in the Netherlands", 1854)
- Graaf Pepoli: de roman van een rijke edelman ("Count Pepoli, a Rich Nobleman's Tale", 1860)
- De triomf van Pisani ("Pisani's Triumph", 1861)
- De verrassing van Hoey in 1595 ("Hoey's Surprise of 1595", 1866)
- De Delftsche wonderdokter ("The Nectromancer of Delft", 1871)
- Majoor Frans ("Major Francis", 1875)
- Raymond de schrijnwerker ("Raymond, Master Carpenter", 1880)
- Volledige romantische werken ("Complete Romantic Works", 1885–1888)

Until 1851, when Toussaint married Johannes Bosboom, her works were published under her maiden name (A. L. G. Toussaint). Later works and reprints of her earlier works carried her married name (A. L. G. Bosboom-Toussaint).
