= Adrianus Johannes Ehnle =

Dutch painter (1819–1863)

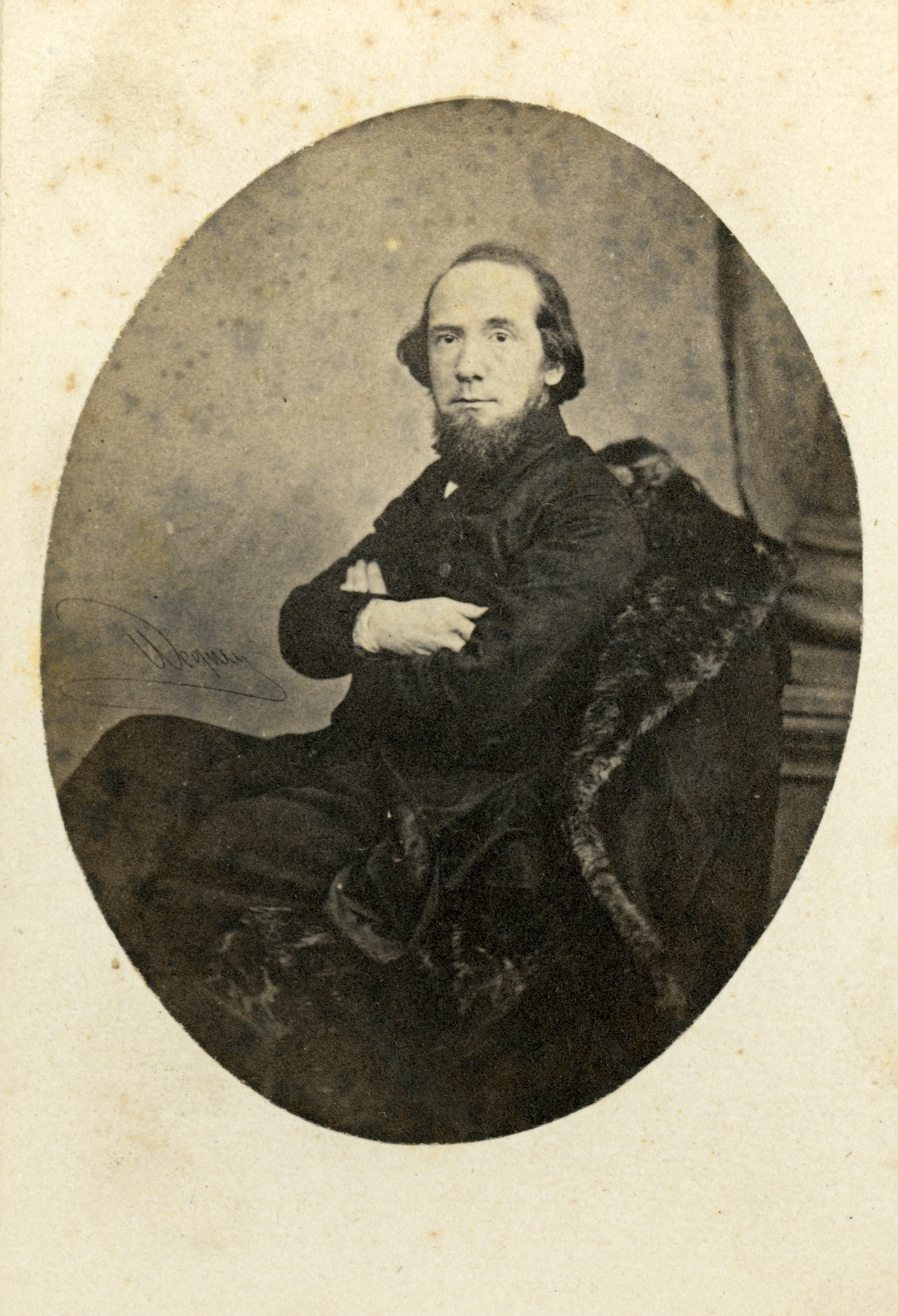
Adrianus Johannes Ehnle, c. 1860

Adrianus Johannes Ehnle (1819–1863) was a Dutch painter of historical and genre subjects. He was born at the Hague in 1819, and studied under C. Kruseman. He died in 1863. Among his works are Cornelis de Witt at Dordrecht and The Reception of a Child at the Orphan House at Haarlem.

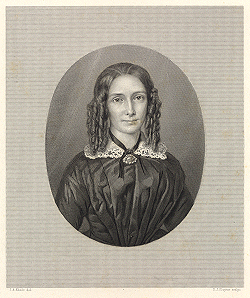
Anna Louisa Geertruida Bosboom-Toussaint, Dutch novelist, c. 1845

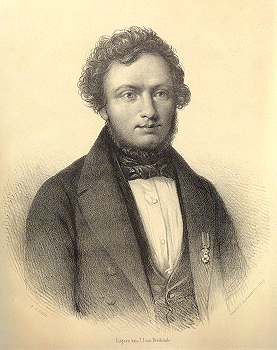
Adriaan van der Hoop jr., Dutch poet and writer

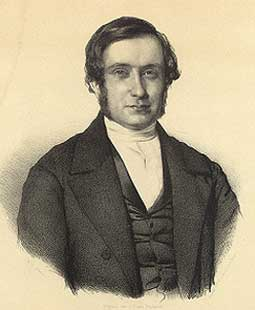
Johannes Petrus Hasebroek, Dutch writer, c. 1850

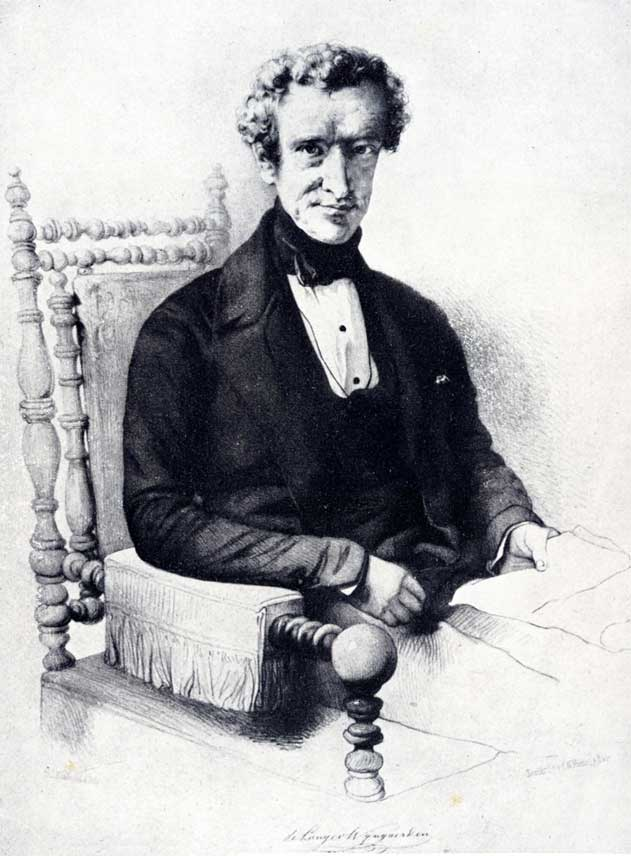
Cornelis Johan de Lange

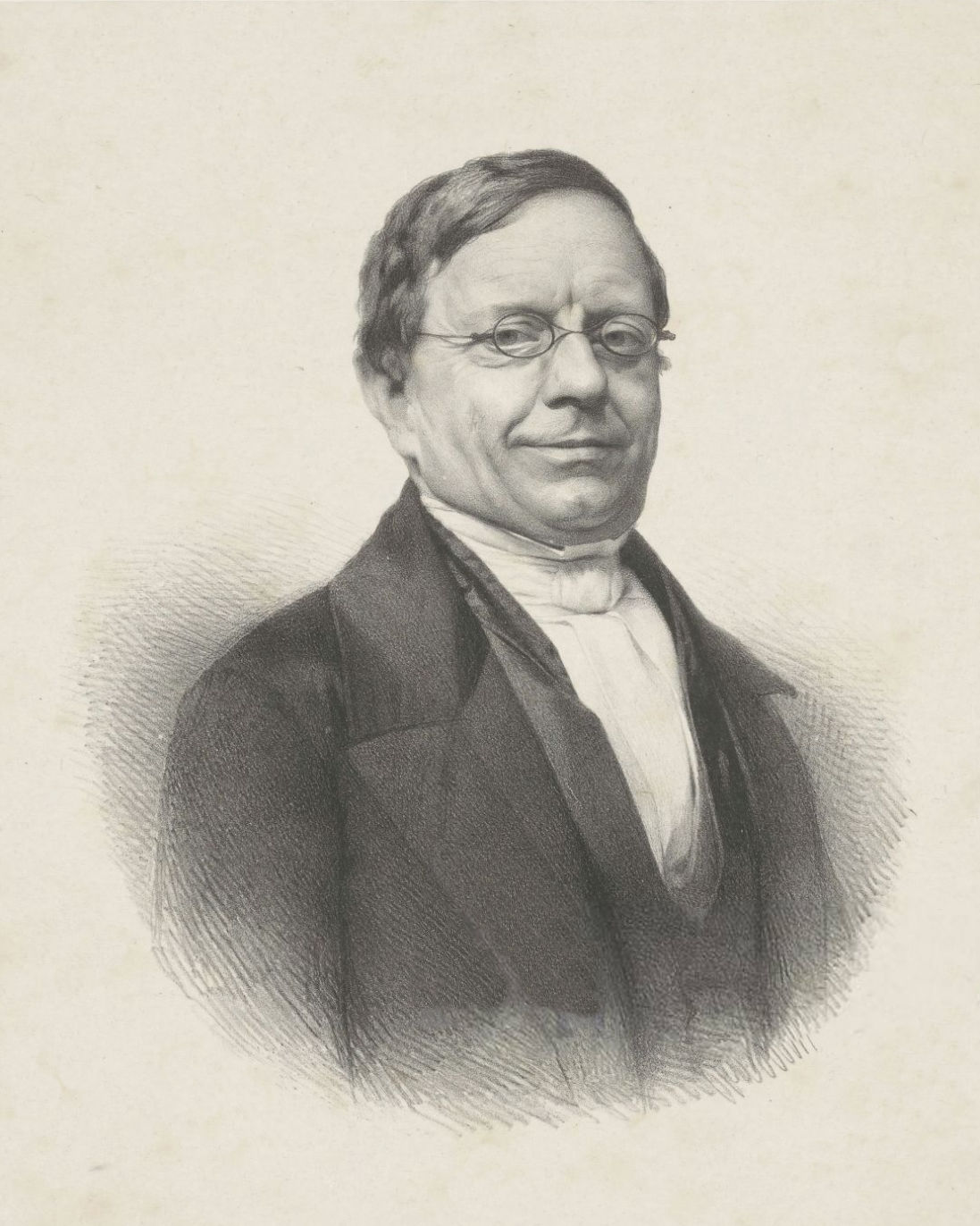
Abraham Jacob van der Aa, Dutch writer, 1853

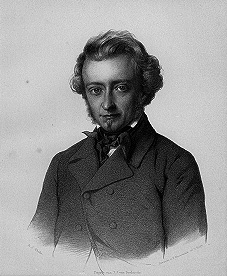
Joseph Albert Alberdingk Thijm, Dutch writer, 1852

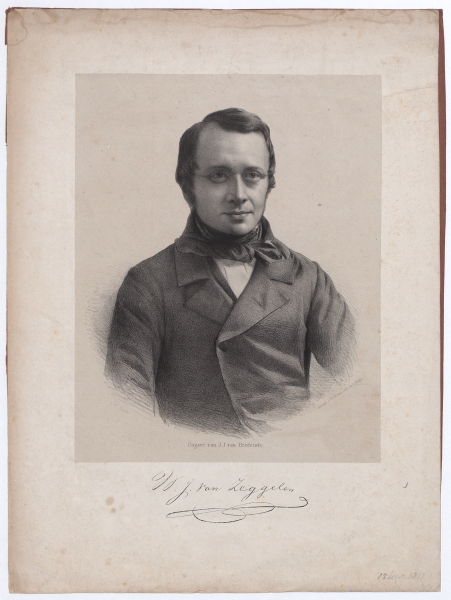
Willem Josephus van Zeggelen, Dutch poet

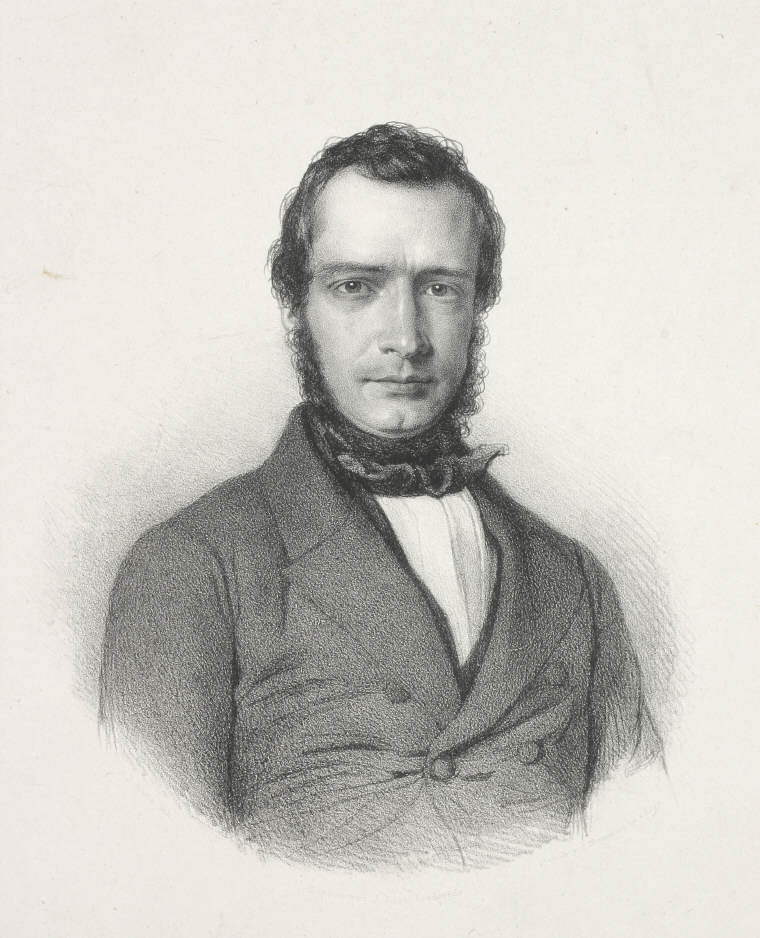
Samuel Johannes van den Bergh, Dutch poet, 1852
