= Petrissage =

Deep pressure technique in massage

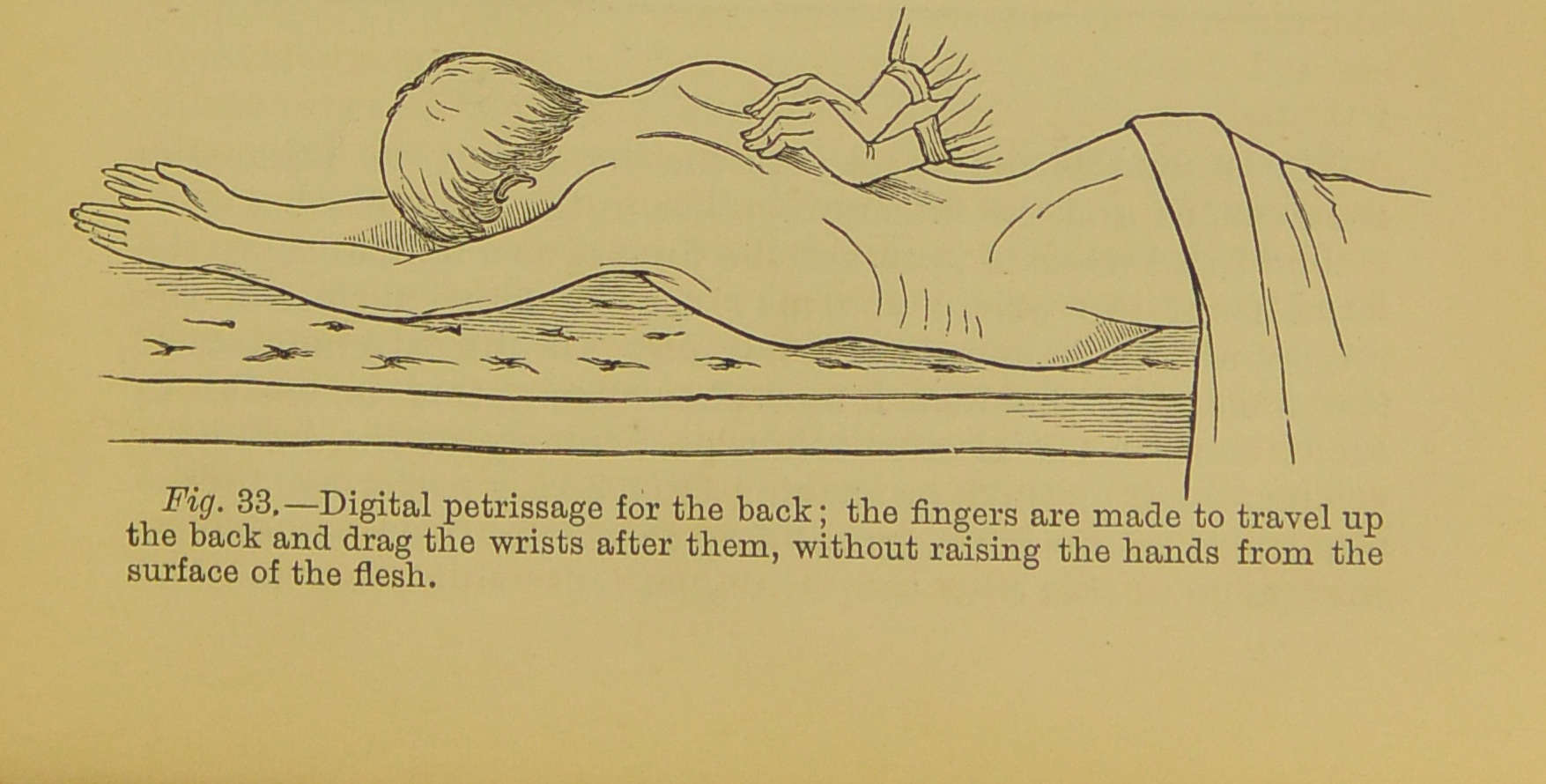

Petrissage (French, from pétrir 'to knead') is a massage technique that applies deep pressure to the underlying muscles. Kneading, wringing, skin rolling, and pick-up-and-squeeze are the petrissage movements. They are all performed with the padded palmar surface of the hand, the surface of the finger and also the thumbs.

During kneading, the hands should be moulded to the area and the movements should be slow and rhythmical, with the tissue between the hands as the focus of the work.

Knuckling is another form of kneading but using the knuckles to knead and lift in circular and upwards motions.

Scissoring is another petrissage movement that is performed only over a flat area with very little pressure. The index and middle fingers of both hands are only used for this movement. They are placed opposite each other and then are slowly worked towards each other lifting and releasing as they go.

It is also a term used in French professional bread baking describing a particular stage during dough development.

== See also ==
- Swedish massage
- Effleurage
- Tapotement
- Gua sha
