= Effleurage =

Type of massage stroke in Swedish massage

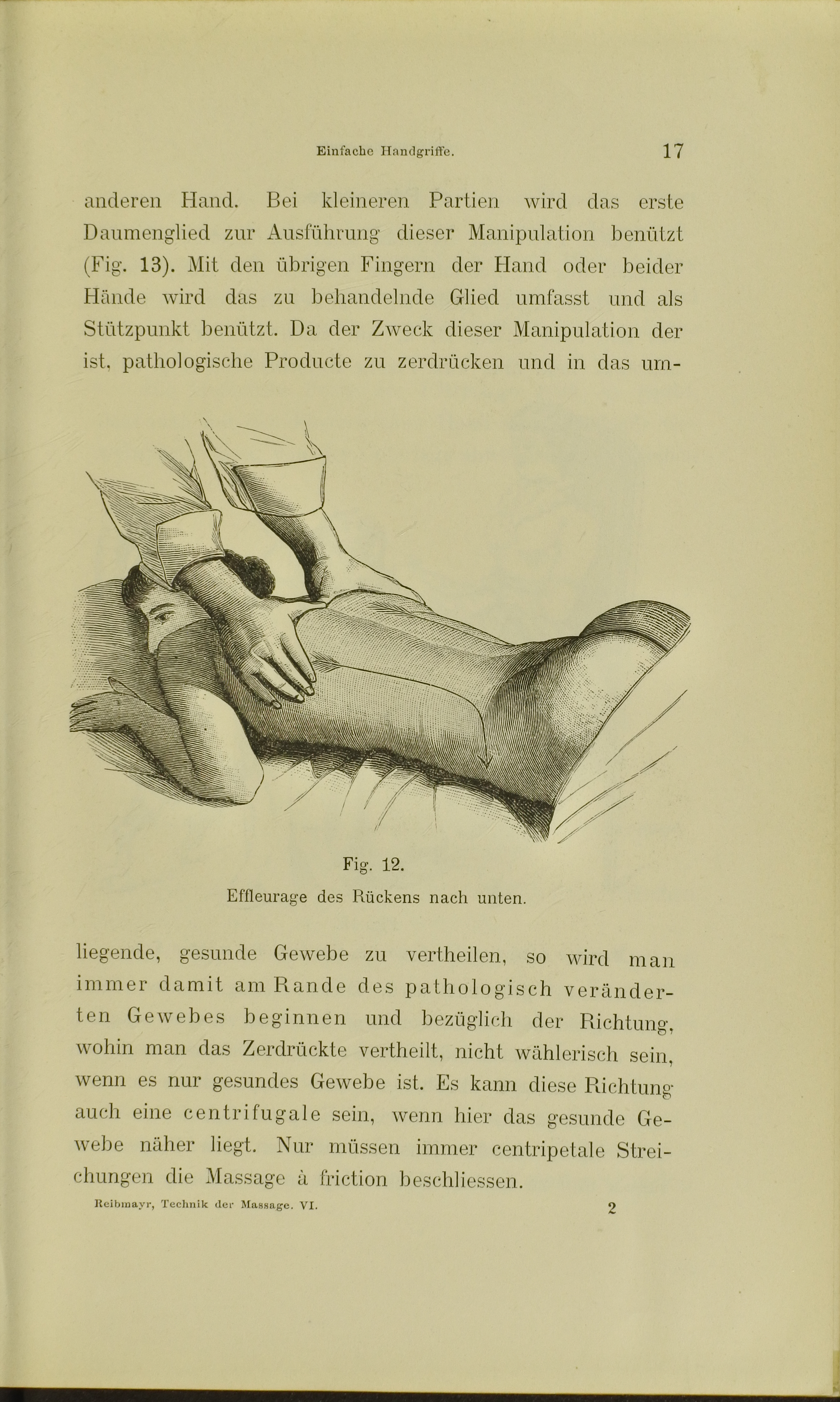

Effleurage, a French word meaning 'to skim' or 'to touch lightly on', is a series of massage strokes used in Swedish massage to warm up the muscle before deep tissue work using petrissage.

This is a soothing, stroking movement used at the beginning and the end of the facial and/or body massage. It is also used as a linking move between the different strokes and movements. Effleurage is basically a form of massage involving a circular stroking movement made with the palm of the hand.

Effleurage can be firm or light without dragging the skin, and is performed using either the padded parts of the finger tips or the palmar surface of the hands. Lotion may or may not be used. The process works as a mechanical pump on the body to encourage venous and lymphatic return by starting at the bottom of the limb and pushing back towards the heart. This will have more success with this once all the muscles in the area are warmed up and loose. It consists of four sub-categories:

1. Ethereal or aura strokes
2. Feathering, or nerve-stroking
3. Superficial effleurage
4. Deeper effleurage

== Usage ==
Effleurage is one of the five components of Swedish massage and is used at the beginning and end of a massage session, as well as between other massage techniques. Regardless of the reason for use, effleurage is always performed in a circular motion from light to medium pressure. The effleurage may vary in speed, direction, and time of the procedure. Effleurage is part of a type of massage called myofascial relaxation, which is used for carpal tunnel syndrome. In some cases, effleurage can be used to reduce labor pain. Clinical studies have shown that Swedish massage can reduce chronic pain, fatigue, joint stiffness. However, the effect of effleurage in relieving muscle fatigue or during recovery from sports injuries is insignificant.

== See also ==
- Massage
- Gua sha
- Petrissage
- Tapotement
