= Tapotement =

Rhythmic percussion technique in Swedish massage

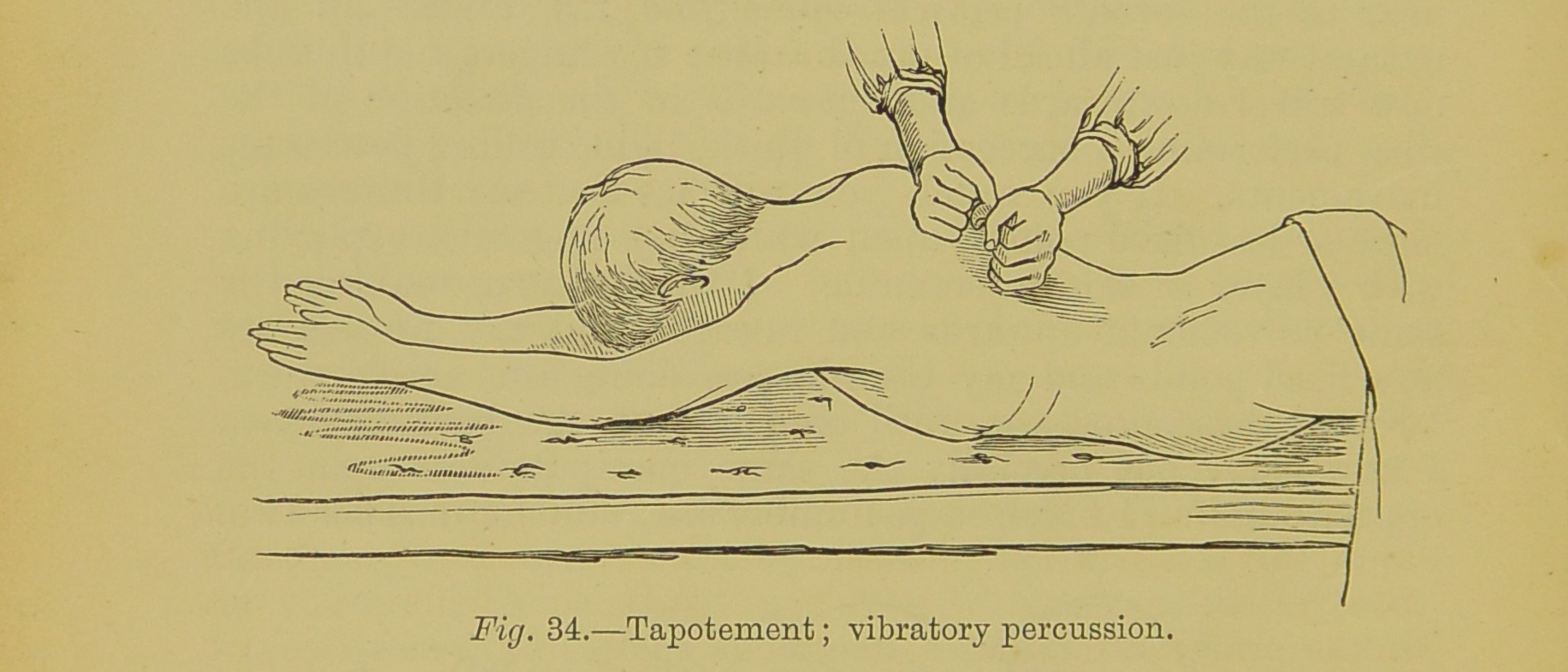

Tapotement is a specific technique used in Swedish massage. A French term, it refers to a rhythmic percussion, most frequently administered with the edge of the hand, a cupped hand, or the tips of the fingers.

== Types ==
There are five types of tapotement including beating (closed fist lightly hitting an area), slapping (use of fingers to gently slap), hacking (use of the edge of the hand on the pinky-finger side), tapping (use of just fingertips), and cupping (use of a cupped hand to gently tap an area). It is primarily used to "wake up" the nervous system and also as a stimulating stroke which can release lymphatic build up in the muscle.

The name of the stroke is French for 'tapping', tapoter 'to tap or drum'.

== See also ==
- Swedish massage
- Effleurage
- Petrissage
- Gua sha
