= Johann Georg Mezger =

Dutch physician (1838–1909)

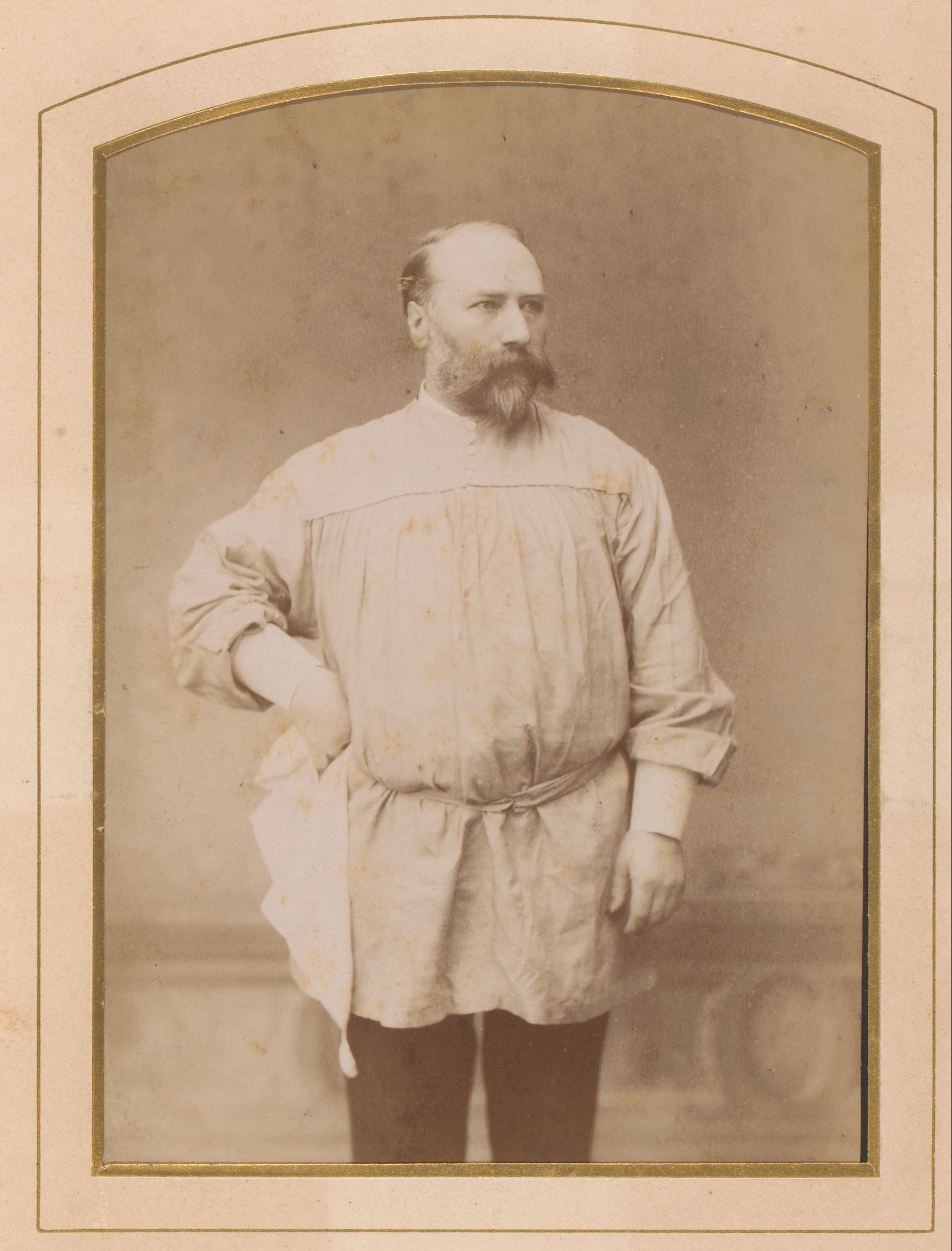

Johann Georg Mezger (22 August 1838 – 3 March 1909) was a Dutch physician and masseur who is considered as one of the founders of physiotherapy and massage therapy.

== Life and work ==
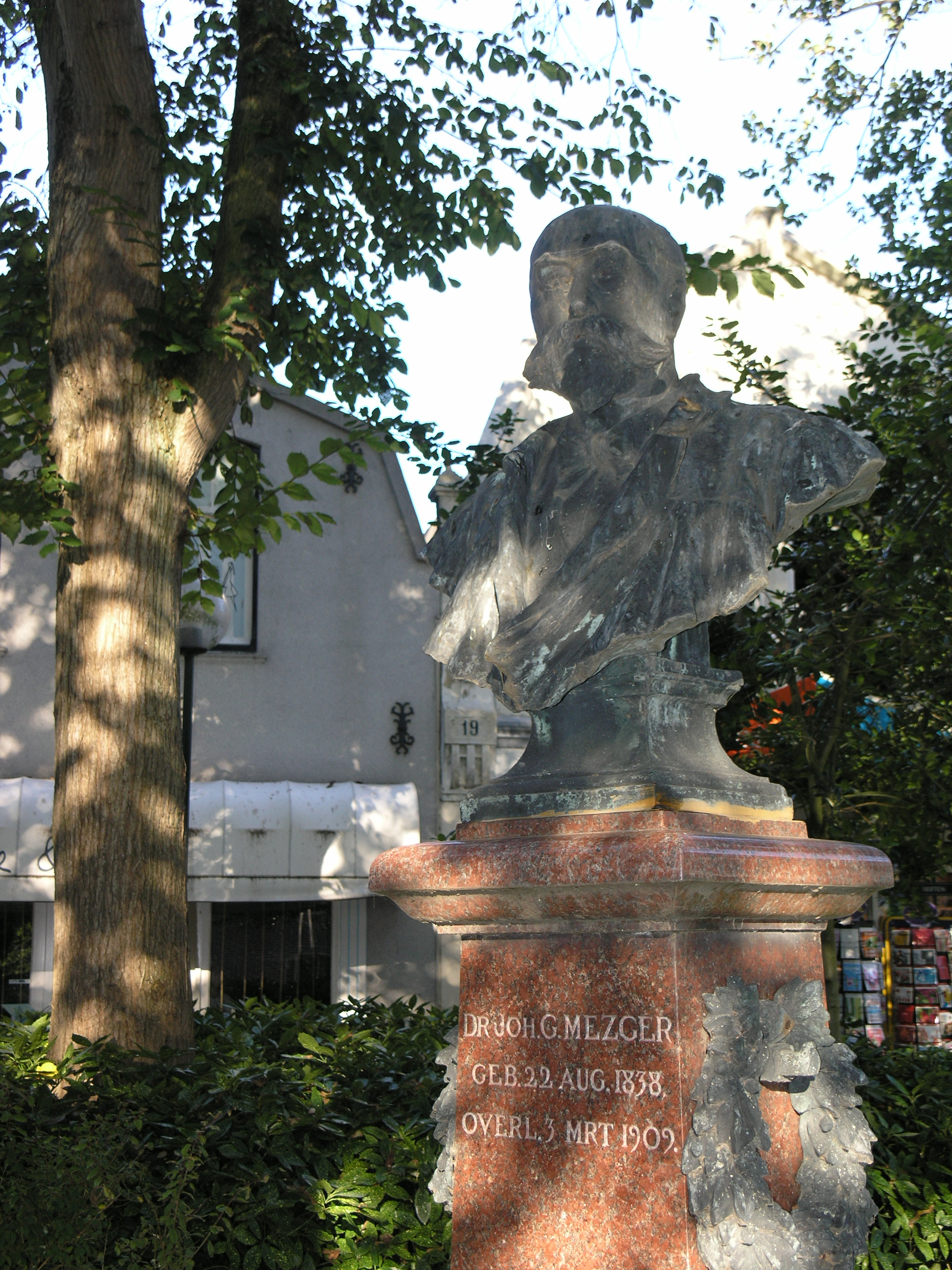
Bust of Mezger in Domburg

Mezger was born in Amsterdam to immigrants from Wurtemberg. He worked initially in his father's butcher shop while also training in gymnastics. He was influenced by the city orthopaedist Justus Lodewijk Dusseau (1824–1887) who noticed his talent and introduced him to Swedish medical gymnastics. He also encouraged Mezger to study medicine. Mezger then studied medicine at the University of Leiden where he used French friction methods on patients with distortions. His 1868 doctoral thesis was on distorsio pedis treated with friction. In 1870, a German newspaper reported successful treatment of an elderly woman who had been bedridden for years under his hands. There were accusations of charlatanism but he was defended by the surgeon Von Mosengeil. He also treated a son of King William III and he was appointed in 1870 for treatment of joint diseases and decorated as an officer of the Order of the Oak Crown. He then had many famous patients including Empress Elisabeth of Austria, Lord Lionel Walter Rothschild, and Chancellor Otto von Bismarck. He initially worked opposite the Amstel Hotel and later rented a larger house nearby. In 1875 he had a neo-classical mansion Nieuwendammerdijk built for his practice. In 1884 he moved to The Hague. In 1888 he moved to Wiesbaden, and then Paris. After his marriage he moved to Domburg where he had a villa built in 1887. With patients turning up, Domburg became a popular seaside spa resort.
