= Gua sha =

Traditional East Asian medicine practice involving skin scraping

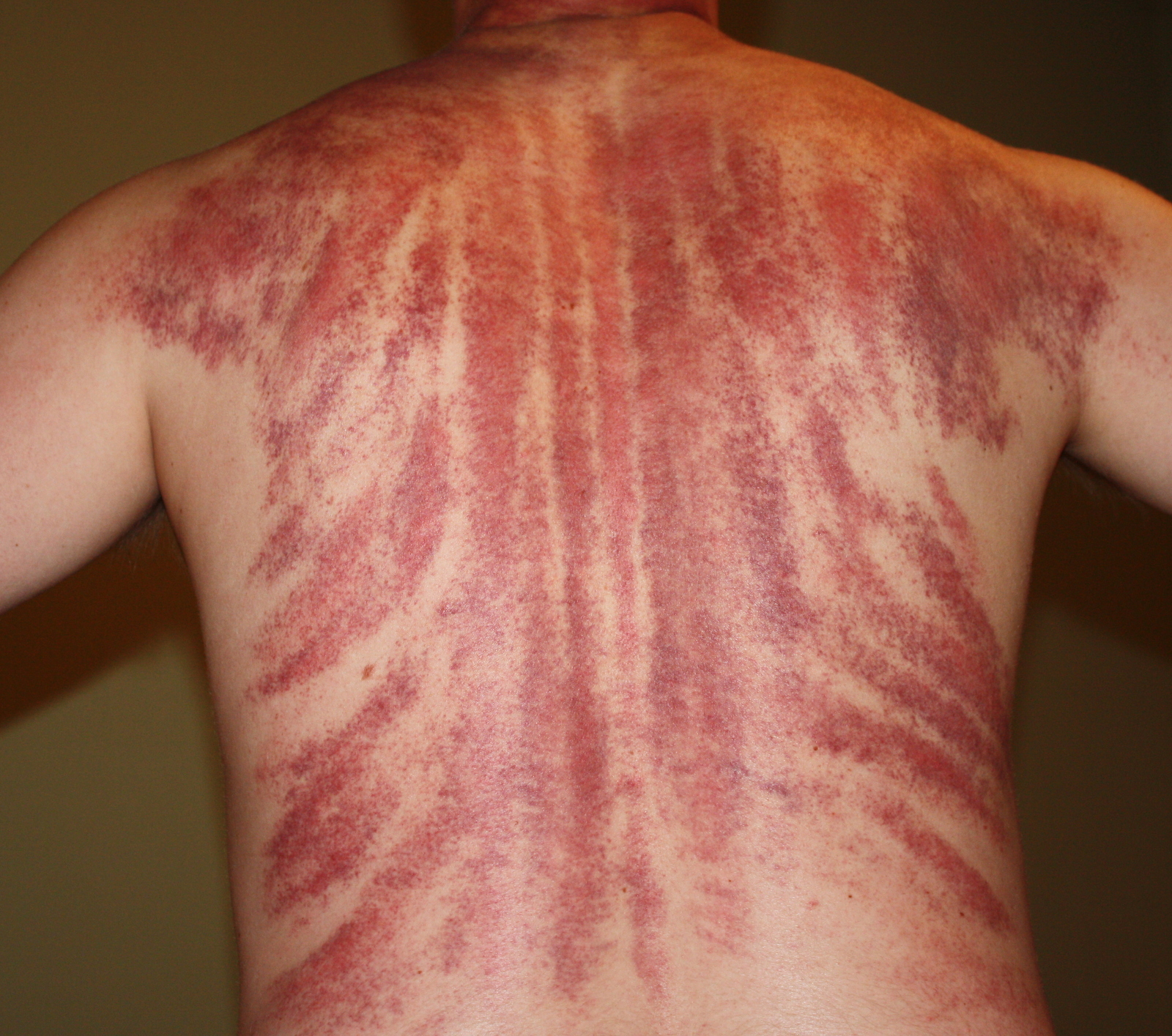
- Skin showing characteristic petechiae after gua sha treatment
- Chinese: 刮痧
- Literal meaning: "scraping sha-bruises"
Transcriptions
Standard Mandarin
- Hanyu Pinyin: guā shā
- IPA: [kwá.ʂá]
Yue: Cantonese
- Yale Romanization: gwaat-sāa
- Jyutping: gwaat^{3}-saa^{1}
- IPA: [kʷat̚˧.sa˥]

Gua sha or scraping therapy is a pseudoscientific practice in traditional Chinese medicine (TCM) in which an object is used to scrape the skin, for purported wide-ranging therapeutic benefits. Gua sha has been used for centuries across East and Southeast Asia.

The practice is known by various names in English, such as "spooning," "coining," and in French as tribo-effleurage (friction-stroking). While it is widely practiced for pain relief, relaxation, and treating symptoms like colds or fatigue, gua sha can cause adverse effects, ranging from mild skin irritation to rare but severe complications.

== Etymology ==
The term gua sha derives from Chinese: gua (刮) meaning "to scrape" and sha (痧), referring to the petechiae or "bruise-like" marks that appear on the skin post-treatment. In TCM, sha is associated with stagnation or blockages in the body’s energy (qi) and blood, which practitioners aim to release.

The practice is originally from China and spread from there to neighbouring regions from East asia into worldwidely practice. A concept linked to the Shanghan Lun, a foundational Chinese medical text from circa 220 CE that discusses cold-induced illnesses.

== History ==
Gua sha traces its origins to ancient China, with evidence of similar scraping techniques dating back to the Paleolithic era, where stones were used to alleviate pain or illness. Its formalized use in TCM emerged during the Ming Dynasty (1368–1644), when texts began documenting the technique as a method to treat sha syndromes—conditions believed to result from environmental factors like wind or cold stagnating in the body.

== Technique ==
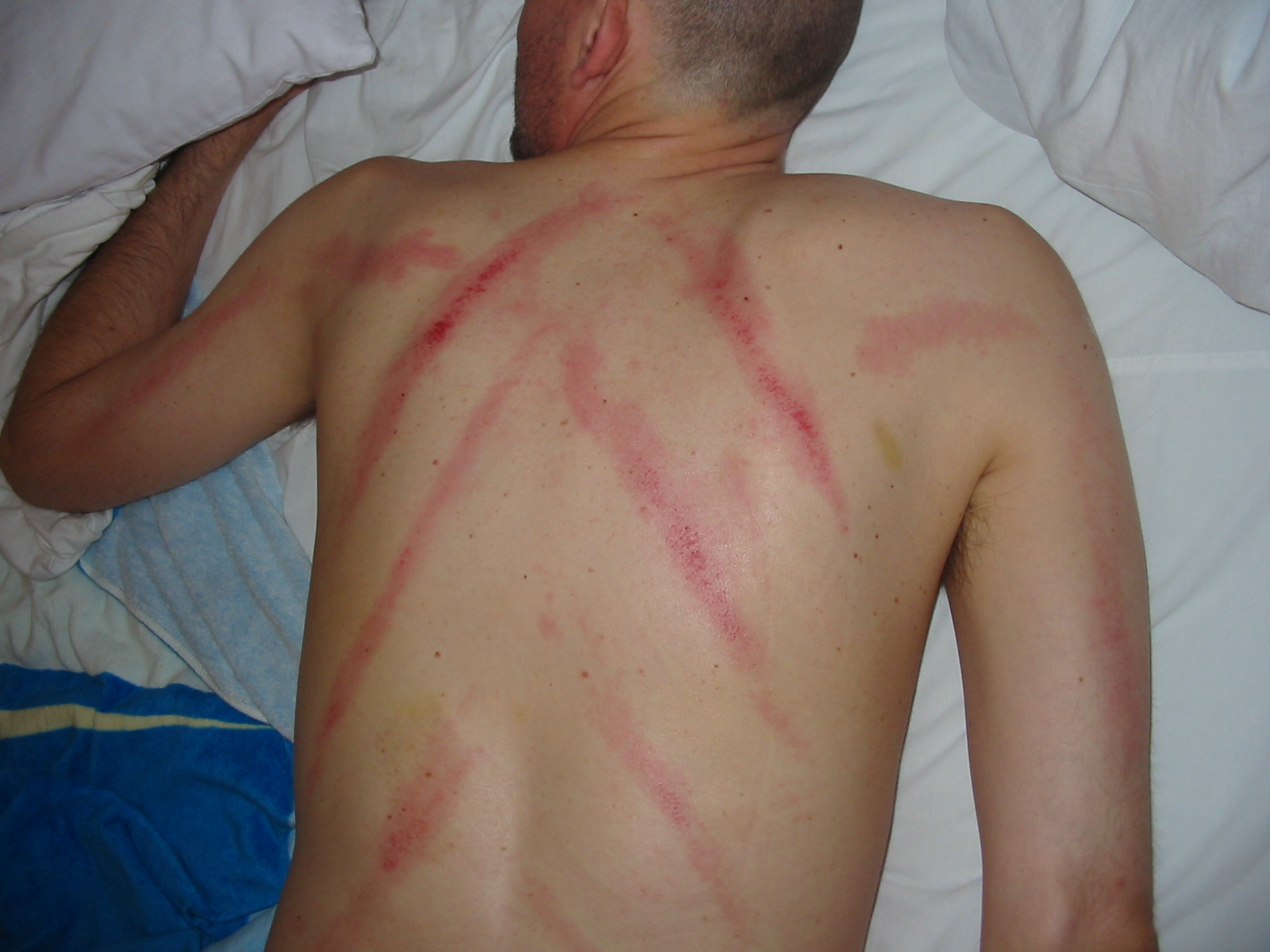
Gua sha being practiced in Bali, Indonesia, using a traditional tool.

Gua sha involves applying firm, unidirectional strokes to lubricated skin using a blunt, smooth-edged tool. Common tools include ceramic spoons, coins, jade stones, water buffalo horn, or specially designed instruments. The skin is typically prepared with massage oil, balm, or even rice wine infused with ginger (used traditionally for fatigue or colds). Strokes are applied along muscle groups or acupuncture meridians, each stroke spanning 4–6 inches, until sha (petechiae) appears.

The technique is often combined with other TCM practices like fire cupping, which also aims to relieve stagnation. Practitioners may vary the pressure based on the condition being treated—lighter for cosmetic purposes (e.g., facial gua sha) and firmer for musculoskeletal issues. In professional settings in China, gua sha is offered in hospitals, clinics, and massage parlors, reflecting its widespread acceptance and affordability.

== Safety and effectiveness ==
Gua sha is a pseudoscience. Proponents make a wide range of claims for its effectiveness for conditions including infection, constipation, and respiratory disease. It lacks high-quality evidence of clinical benefit, relying on misinterpreted physiological markers.

Gua sha can cause tissue damage. It nearly always causes minor skin trauma, including redness, bruising, or dermatitis.

The negative side effects of gua sha range from minor ones – including dermatitis, burns and blood in the urine – to rare major ones including bleeding in the brain and severe injuries requiring skin grafts.

The risk of infection is a significant concern if tools are not properly sterilized or if open wounds are present. While no documented cases of blood-borne pathogen transmission (e.g., hepatitis) have been directly linked to gua sha, the potential exists, particularly in informal settings.

== Cross-cultural perceptions and misunderstandings ==
In immigrant communities, particularly among Vietnamese, Cambodian, and Indonesian diaspora, gua sha (or its local variants) remains a common home remedy. In the United States, healthcare providers in areas with large Southeast Asian populations, such as Orange County, California, frequently encounter patients with sha marks. However, these marks have been mistaken for signs of physical abuse, leading to legal and cultural misunderstandings.

In the 1980s, Vietnamese immigrants in the U.S. expressed distrust toward Western medical providers, partly due to fears of being reported for child abuse when practicing cạo gió on their children. U.S. physicians are legally obligated to report suspected abuse, regardless of cultural context, complicating cross-cultural healthcare interactions.

== Popular culture ==
Gua sha has appeared in various media, reflecting its cultural significance and occasional controversy. The 2001 Hong Kong film The Gua Sha Treatment explores a Chinese-American family’s struggle when a welfare agency misinterprets gua sha marks on a child as abuse. The film highlights cultural clashes and differing definitions of care versus harm.

In 2021–2022, gua sha surged in popularity on TikTok, driven by beauty influencers promoting facial gua sha for lymphatic drainage and skin rejuvenation.

In the United States, gua sha is one of many types of traditional medicine included in certain states' licensing laws under an umbrella recognition of traditional Chinese medicine.

== See also ==
- Graston technique – A modern therapeutic scraping method
- Cupping therapy – Another TCM practice for stagnation relief
- C-beauty – Chinese beauty trends influencing global markets
- Acupuncture – TCM practice involving meridians
