= Bamboo massage =

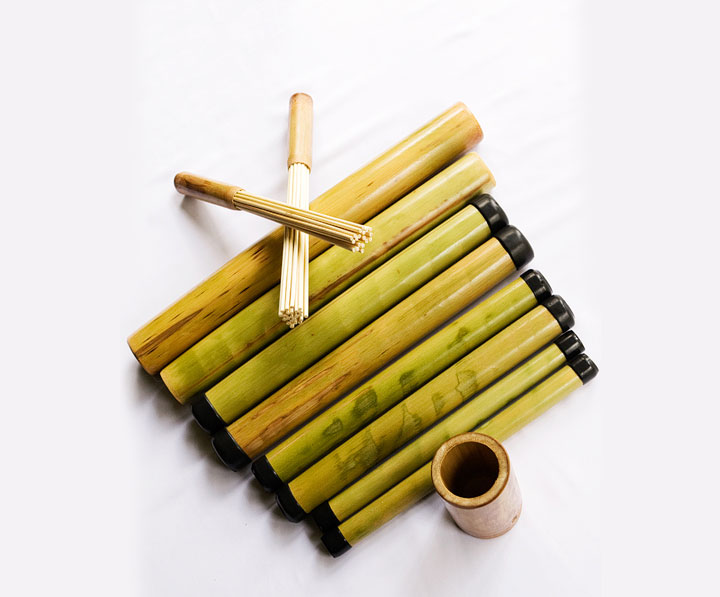
Traditional bamboo massage kit

In Bamboo massage, hollow bamboo canes are used as a massage tool, either warmed or at room temperature. They can be used with or without hot stones.

== Technique ==
The bamboo cane replaces the therapist's hands, and it is used to give a deep, firm massage. The cane is held by the therapist and rolled over the muscle with the same strokes they would use with their hands. The muscle is then kneaded, which assists in the release of tension and easing of knots. Massage practitioners often use the whole arm from elbow to wrist, and the use of the bamboo cane replaces this technique.

== Effect ==
This technique works in a very similar way to stone massage. Hands are used to work over the muscles and the cane is used to focus on knots. As the cane is used instead of the hand, various techniques and modalities can incorporate the use of bamboo canes. This can have the benefit of less stress to the practitioner's hands and arms.

== See also ==
- Balinese massage
- The Art of Massage
