= Massage table =

Table used by massage therapists to position clients for massage

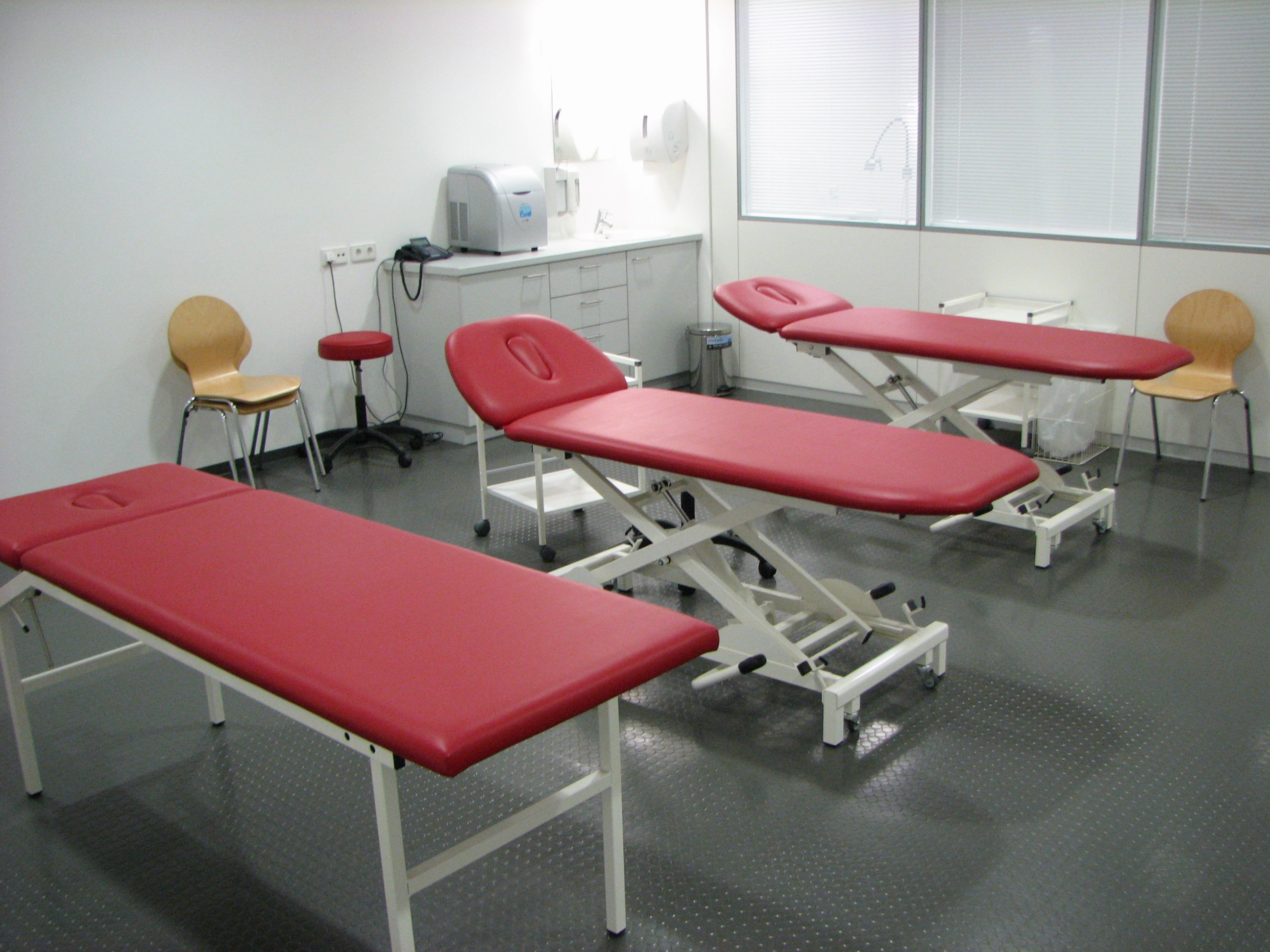
Massage room with three massage tables

A massage table is used by massage therapists to position the client to receive a massage. Most are manufactured with client comfort and therapist ergonomics in mind. A typical table has an easily cleaned, heavily padded surface, and a face cradle that allows the client to breathe easily while lying face down.

Customizable tables can include a powered center section, variable position armrests and adjustable head section to create better body mechanics for the therapist so that they can better treat the client.

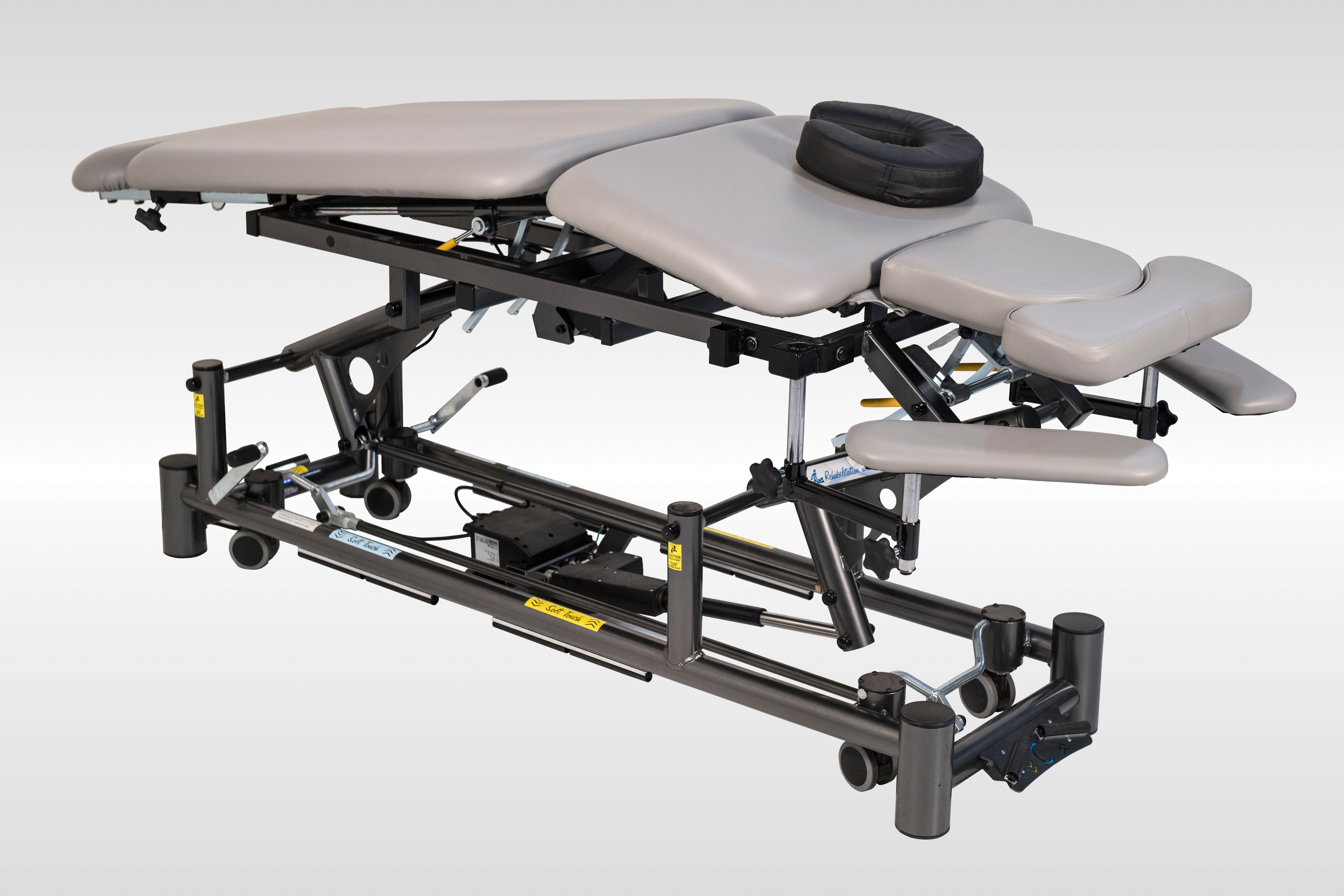
Cardon Skye Massage Table

Tables may be either stationary or portable, depending on the intended use. Additional padding or supports such as specific supports for pregnancy massage, may be used as accessories to the basic table. Common additions also included speciality heated pads and draping sheets.

There are many uses for massage tables beyond basic massage therapy. They can also be used as an examination table by doctors and medical practitioners, and can be used by specialized practitioners like: reflexologists, physiotherapists, osteopaths, acupuncturists, reiki practitioners and even beauty therapists like facialists.

When it comes to choosing the right massage table one should consider many factors like: what type of therapy will be performed and what are specific needs for proper therapy treatment. Uniform surface provides patient with comfort which is needed for general massages and therapy. Some massages like sport massage require special patient positions and for that more-sections therapy tables should be used.

== See also ==
- Massage chair
