= Massage for Relaxation =

Massage For Relaxation
- 1987 VHS cover art
- Directed by: Patricia Mooney
- Written by: Patricia Mooney
- Produced by: Mark Schulze; Patricia Mooney
- Starring: Patricia Mooney; Mayo Campos
- Narrated by: Patricia Mooney
- Cinematography: Mark Schulze
- Music by: Richard Plasko
- Distributed by: New & Unique Videos
- Release date: 1985
- Running time: 45 minutes
- Country: United States
- Language: English

Massage For Relaxation is a 1985 instructional video and was among the first on how to massage another person. The video was produced by Mark Schulze and Patricia Mooney of New & Unique Videos, of San Diego, California.

== Background ==
Patricia Mooney graduated from the Mueller College of Massage in San Diego as a massage technician in 1981, and subsequently authored several articles in national publications. In 1987 she added additional footage of Self Massage instruction to the 1985 prequel. The film was videotaped and live-switched in a Public-access television studio with three video cameras, and distributed worldwide on VHS, Beta and PAL videotape formats.

== Synopsis ==
The instructional film shows Cleo (aka Patty Mooney) performing a massage on Maria (aka Maya Campos) using Swedish Oil techniques. Also included are instructions for a Glowing Salt Rub.

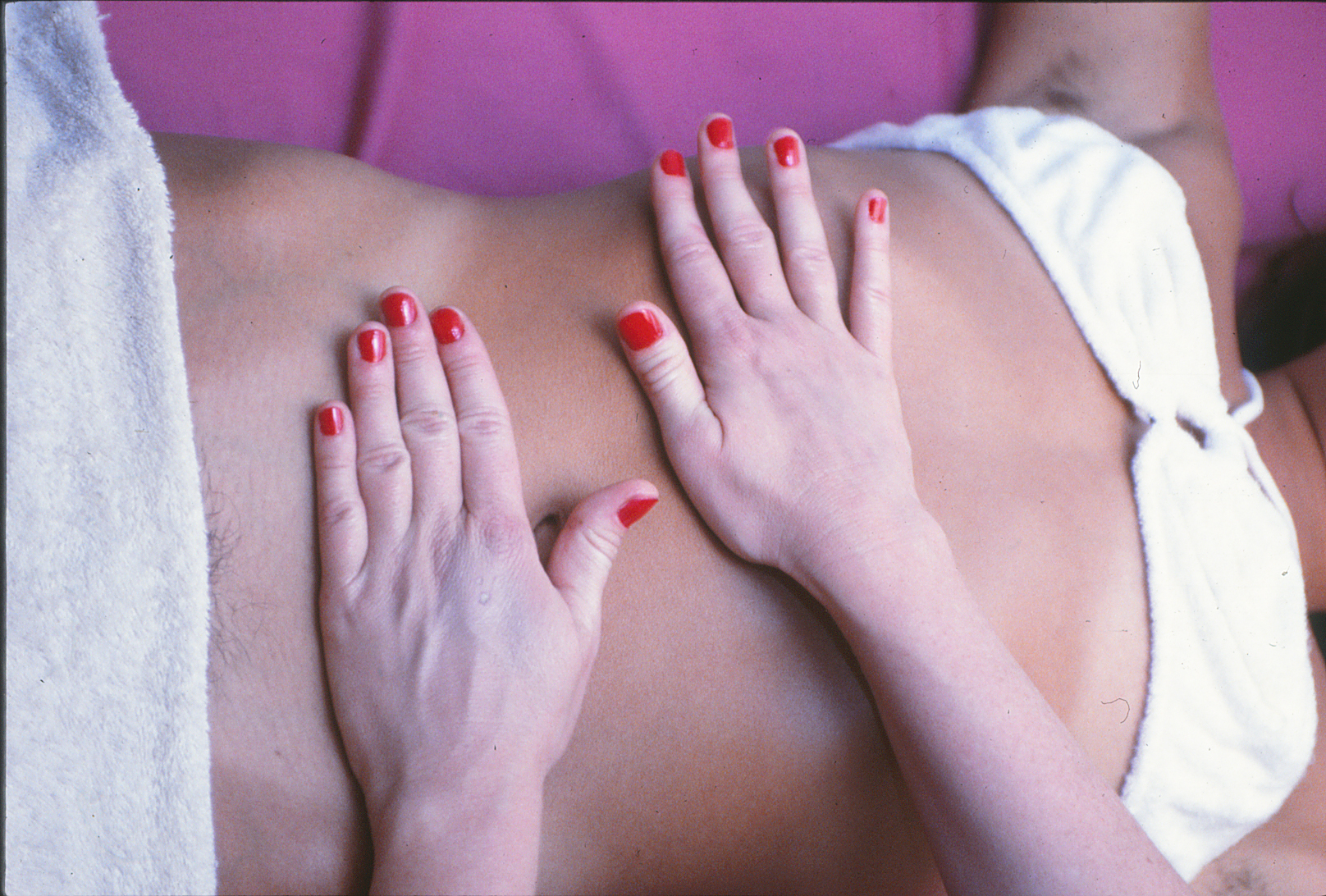
Patty Mooney Demonstrates How to Massage the Abdomen in Massage For Relaxation Instructional Video – Photo by Mark Schulze

== Release ==
New & Unique Videos was founded in 1985. That same year, the 45-minute instructional video Massage for Relaxation was listed in a special interest video Christmas catalog at London's Heathrow Airport bookstore." Other special interest video distributors carried the title in their catalogs, including Wood Knapp, BFS Limited in Canada, Instructional Video, Inc., The Learning Annex, and Publishers Clearing House.

In 2011, New & Unique Videos reissued Massage For Relaxation in DVD format, and made it available for on-demand downloading at video kiosks at Microsoft and Sony Style stores in Europe and the United States.

In 2023, New & Unique Videos released an AI-Enhanced 4K version of Massage For Relaxation which can be viewed at Vimeo on Demand.

== Recognition ==
=== Awards and nominations ===
In 1985, the film won an International Television Association (ITVA) Video Medallion Award.

=== Reception ===
In July 1995, P.J. Birosik of Nexus magazine noted the 1985 ITVA award and commented that the video had a "soothing score" making it "easy to relax while learning how to massage oneself or another." He noted also that through closeup shots the demonstrations were clear and the proffered techniques of massage and salt rub were easy to learn.

In September 1988, Billboard Magazine wrote that while "Everyone enjoys a good massage", "the difficult part is getting someone to give you one," noting "Briskly paced and modestly priced, this program just may make a dent in the sell-through market."

Vegetarian Times wrote that after a hard workout, a massage is always welcome, and noted the instruction available through the film.

Total Health Magazine found the video to be unique in that it "is both instructional for someone learning to be a masseur and instructor Cleo demonstrates how to give yourself a massage. Techniques are plainly shown how to relieve tension in neck, shoulders, back, hips, chest, abdomen, legs, arms, feet, face and head".

Health Foods Business wrote in 1988 that while the benefits of massage might be obtainable "from the hands of a trained and certified pro," decent massage can be done by amateurs who use some of the available "books and video cassettes which, while not a substitute for a massage therapy course, can help the nonprofessional acquire some skills for home use." They noted that Massage For Relaxation, put together in 1985 by trained masseuse and frequently published author Patricia Mooney, is one such video and that it contained "a 15-minute section on self-massage."

The Video Rating Guide for Libraries wrote that while the video's cover jacket was "attractive and provocative", it was an otherwise "highly professional, nonpornographic treatment of whole body massage," noting that the camera angles and detail work presented an "excellent focus on various techniques of massage", and that the benefits of whole body massage were featured with "emphasis placed on relieving pain and enhancing digestion." They made special note of the video including detailed explanation of self-massage techniques, and that the instructor's demonstrations of a wide variety of techniques would be "especially useful for novices".

== See also ==
- Home video, history
