= Balinese massage =

Style of massage from Bali

Balinese massage was developed in the Indonesian province of Bali, with influence from the traditional medicine systems of India, China, and Southeast Asia.

Balinese massage techniques include acupressure, skin rolling and flicking, firm and gentle stroking, percussion, and application of essential oils. The practitioner may also apply stone massage. The combination of manual therapy and aromatherapy is intended for relaxation, loosening fascial restrictions, and stimulating the lymphatic system and the flow of blood and qi.
