= Chavutti Thirumal =

Traditional Indian massage technique

Chavutti Thirumal, literally meaning "foot pressure" in the Malayalam language and also known as "foot/rope massage", is a traditional Indian massage technique developed by the Kalari Martial Artists of Kerala India (Kalaripayattu), and it is thought to be approximately two thousand years old. The Kalaripayattu not only trained in battle but also developed a range of healing modalities known as Kalari Chikitsa, which comprises various massage techniques; Chavutti Thirumal, Marma Massage (Uzhichil), and the application of medicinal herbal oils.

== Overview ==
Unlike most massage modalities, Chavutti Thirumal is unique as the feet are used to deliver the treatment. This act is an art form, with the technique being precisely executed by the practitioner's foot in long, sweeping therapeutic motions from the fingers to the toes of the recipient. The main focus of Chavutti Thirumal is to increase flexibility, so the position of the recipient's body on the floor with the therapist holding onto a rope for support, is paramount. Correctly positioned, the massage enables the postural muscles to strengthen, the hips and thoracic area to open, and the energetic channels (nadi) to become activated.

An Ida and Pingala approach is evident in Kalaripayattu, with Kalari Chikitsa being entwined within the training regime where it is used to prepare and heal the body in the two distinct training and healing seasons.
