= Massage chair =

Chair designed for massages

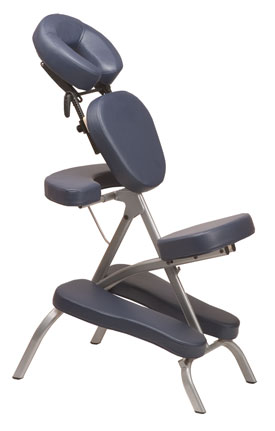
Traditional massage chair

A massage chair is a chair designed for massages. It can refer to two types of products:

Traditional massage chairs allow a massage therapist to easily access the head, shoulders, and back of a massage recipient. Alternatively, electric massage chairs use electronic vibrators and motors to provide a massage.

== Traditional ==
Chair massage is done in an ergonomically designed portable chair. Chair massage focuses on the head, neck, shoulders, back, arms and hands. Massage therapists are able to offer on-site massage to many environments because of the portability of the massage chair, and clients do not need to disrobe to receive a chair massage. Due to these two factors, chair massage is often performed in settings such as business offices, employee appreciation events, trade shows, conferences, and other corporate settings.

== Electric massage chair ==
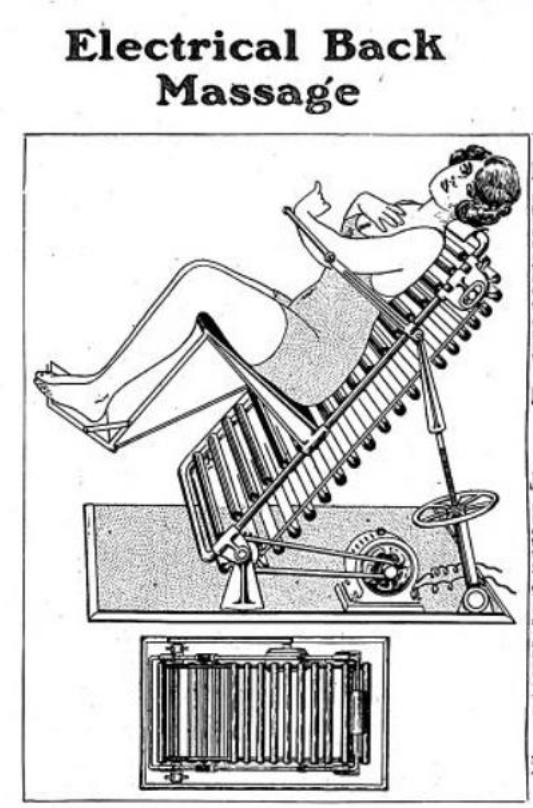
Glenn S. Noble's 1919 Electric Massage chair, featured in The Electrical Experimenter

=== History ===
By 1904, several electric chairs had been invented for massage and physical therapy use (then called "physiologic therapeutics"). These included "the shaking chair invented by Charcot...the shaking couch of the Zander system" and the "electric percussor or percuteur of Dr. Mortimer Granville", the last of which was able to strike "one to two thousand blows in a minute". However, it advised against the usage of such machines as the movements could not be customized as well as those of a physical therapist, and the machines' downside included "the enormous cost of the outfit and of its running".

The 1919 The Electrical Experimenter reported and illustrated an "electrically driven massage machine" invented by Glenn S. Noble of Chicago, titled the "Electric Roller Chair". The chair used a small electric motor to control wooden rollers; the receipient could operate a cross-bar to control the intensity and pressure. It featured an accompanying footrest and the chains could be driven in either direction, though Noble recommended to drive the engaging rollers "in a downward directrion".

In 1954, Nobuo Fujimoto of Osaka, Japan created the world's first mass-marketed chair using wood, metal, and scrap materials. Robotic massage chairs were first brought to market in 1954 by the Family Fujiryoki company. As of 2018, Japan is the largest consumer of massage chairs with some surveys suggesting that over 20% of Japanese households actually own a massage chair.

The first electric massage chair was invented in Japan before World War II.

=== Description ===
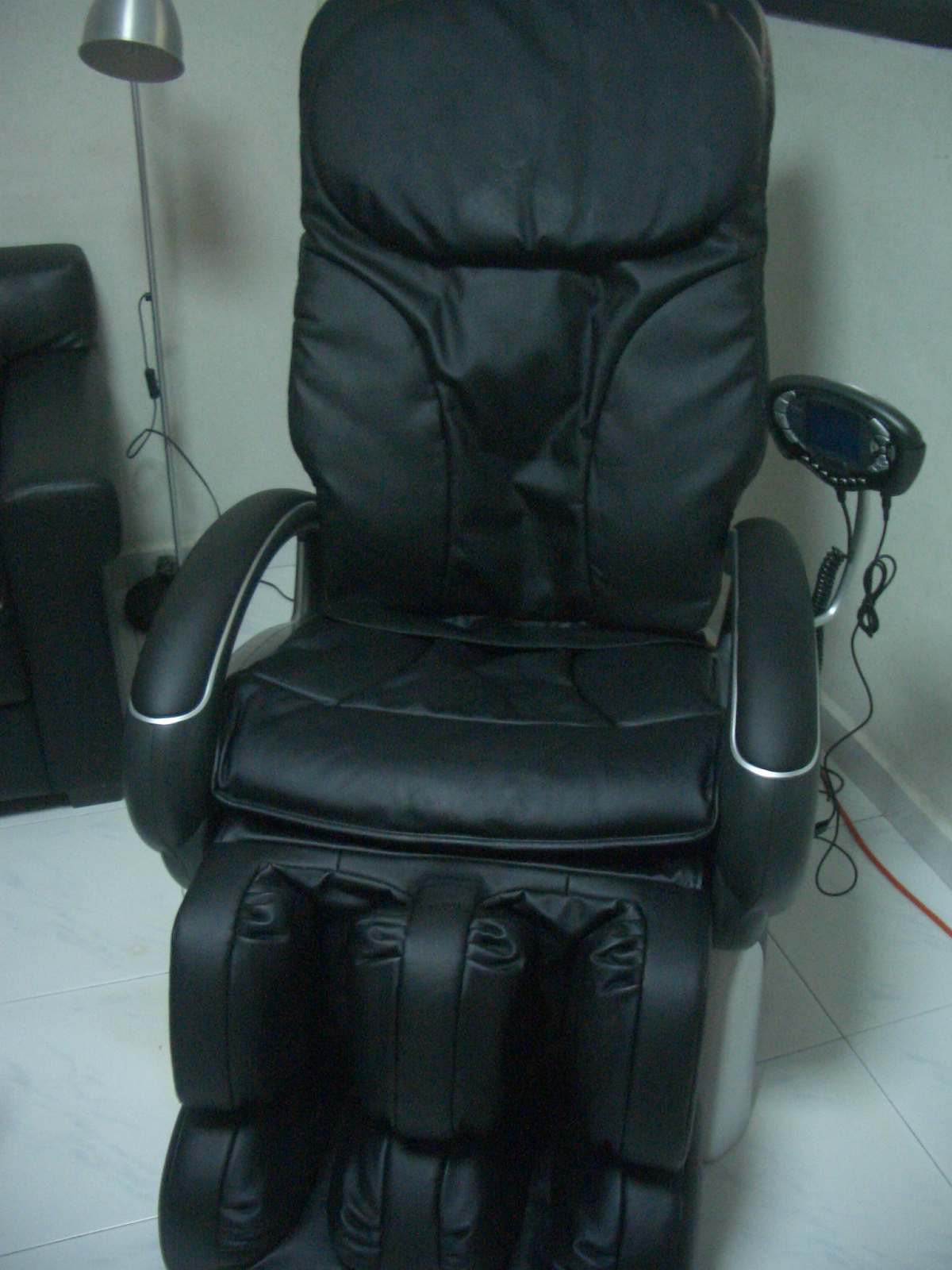
Robotic massage chair, 2007

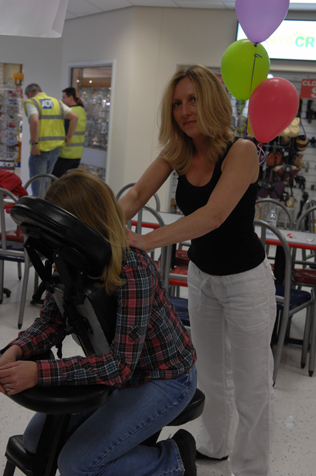
A massage chair in use at RAF Lakenheath, 2008

A robotic massage chair contains internal electronic motors and gears designed to massage the person sitting in them.

Massage chairs are designed to mimic the hand motions of a massage therapist. They use a combination of massage rollers and airbags to massage the different parts of the body.

Massage chairs vary tremendously in price, style and intensity, from cheap "vibrate only" chairs to full intensity Shiatsu models. Massaging chairs most frequently resemble recliners.

Most robotic massage chairs have some form of controller to vary the type, location, or intensity of the massage.

There are many different types and brands, including office-style chairs that operate from internal batteries. A less expensive option is a separate massaging pad that may be used with an existing chair.

=== Benefits ===
The benefits of a massage chair include deep relaxation, reduced blood pressure, a lower pulse rate, and increased rate of metabolism.

== See also ==
- Back pain
- Massage table
- Shiatsu
